Various characters appeared in the sitcom Friends and its spin-off series Joey, which respectively aired for ten seasons and two seasons on NBC from 1994 to 2006. Friends featured six main cast members:  Rachel Green-Geller (Jennifer Aniston), Monica Geller-Bing (Courteney Cox), Phoebe Buffay-Hannigan (Lisa Kudrow), Joey Tribbiani (Matt LeBlanc), Chandler Bing (Matthew Perry), and Ross Geller (David Schwimmer), while Joey featured LeBlanc in the title role reprising his role as Tribbiani alongside Gina Tribbiani (Drea de Matteo), Alex Garrett (Andrea Anders), Michael Tribbiani (Paulo Costanzo), Bobbie Morganstern (Jennifer Coolidge), Zach Miller (Miguel A. Núñez Jr.), and Howard (Ben Falcone). 

Many well-known actors guest-starred on both series throughout their combined twelve-year run.

Ensemble cast
The main cast members of Friends were familiar to US television viewers before their roles on the series, but were not considered to be stars. Series creator David Crane wanted all six characters to be equally prominent, and the series was lauded as being "the first true 'ensemble' show". The cast members made efforts to keep the ensemble format and not allow one member to dominate; they entered themselves in the same acting categories for awards, opted for collective instead of individual salary negotiations, and asked to appear together on magazine cover photos in the first season. The cast members became best friends off screen, and one guest star, Tom Selleck, reported sometimes feeling left out. The cast remained good friends after the series' run, notably Cox and Aniston, with Aniston being godmother to Cox and David Arquette's daughter, Coco. In the official farewell commemorative book Friends 'Til the End, each separately acknowledged in their respective interview that the cast had become their family.

Salaries
In their original contracts for the first season, the main cast were paid $22,500 per episode. The cast members received different salaries in the second season, ranging from $25,000 to $40,000 per episode, with Jennifer Aniston and David Schwimmer being the highest paid. Prior to their salary negotiations for the third season, the cast decided to enter collective negotiations, despite Warner Bros.' preference for individual deals. The main cast were paid $75,000 per episode for the third season, $85,000 for the fourth, $100,000 for the fifth, and $125,000 for the sixth. They received $750,000 per episode for the seventh and eighth seasons, and $1 million per episode for the ninth and tenth seasons. The cast also receive syndication royalties beginning with the fifth season.

Overview

Family trees

Main characters

Friends
All six main actors in Friends had prior experience in situation comedy, and, in some cases, improvisational comedy as well. All six actors appear in every episode.

Rachel Green

Rachel Karen Green (Jennifer Aniston) is the spoiled but warm-hearted and likable daughter of Dr. Leonard Green (Ron Leibman), a rich, Long Island vascular surgeon, and Sandra Green (Marlo Thomas). She has two sisters, Jill (Reese Witherspoon) and Amy (Christina Applegate). Rachel is introduced into the series in the first episode after she leaves her fiancé, Barry Farber, at the altar, and attempts to live independently without financial support from her parents. She flees from her almost-wedding to New York City to find Monica Geller, her friend from high school. Rachel moves into Monica's apartment and meets Phoebe Buffay and Joey Tribbiani. Rachel already knows Ross Geller, Monica's brother, as all three attended Lincoln High School. In the first episode, she is also reacquainted with Chandler Bing, Ross's college buddy; however, later episodes retcon this, and she is shown to have met Chandler on Thanksgiving, whilst Ross was at college. Rachel's first job is as a waitress at Central Perk coffee house. She later begins to work in fashion, becoming an assistant buyer, and later a personal shopper, at Bloomingdale's. She eventually becomes a buyer at Polo Ralph Lauren.

A great deal of Rachel's life throughout the series revolves around her relationship with Ross Geller. At the end of season seven, during Monica's and Chandler's wedding, it is revealed that Rachel is pregnant from a one-night stand with Ross. Initially, Rachel is determined to raise the baby on her own, but later she realizes she needs Ross's help. She decides to move in with Ross, even though the two are not involved in an intimate relationship. Their daughter is born during the eighth-season finale. Her aunt Monica, 'gives' an indecisive Rachel the name Emma, which she had chosen for her own daughter, at age 14.

During the tenth season, Rachel is offered a job with Louis Vuitton in Paris. She accepts and prepares to move herself and Emma to France. However, in the series finale, she declines the job offer and famously "gets off the plane". Rachel and Ross get back together in the final episode of the series.

Monica Geller

Monica E. Geller (Courteney Cox) is the younger sister of Ross and best friend of Rachel, the latter of whom she allows to live with her after Rachel forsakes her own wedding. She works primarily as a chef at a variety of restaurants. She is described as the mother hen of the group, and is known for her obsessive-compulsive and competitive nature. Monica is often jokingly teased by the others, especially Ross, for having been overweight as a teen.

In the second season, Monica falls for her father Jack's (Elliott Gould) friend, Richard Burke (Tom Selleck). Despite the twenty-one year age difference, Monica and Richard are happy, and her parents accept their relationship. However, as a result of Monica yearning for a family but Richard having already had one, they break up at the end of the second season. Monica then pursues a chain of various men until she unexpectedly begins a relationship with her longtime friend, Chandler Bing, at the end of the fourth season, during her brother Ross' wedding to Emily Waltham in London. Monica and Chandler try to hide their relationship from the rest of the group for much of the fifth season, but eventually everyone finds out. After celebrating their first anniversary in Las Vegas, they move in together and get engaged by the sixth-season finale. After their marriage, Monica and Chandler try to conceive children, only to discover that they are unable to do so. In the final season of the series, they adopt new-born twins, whom they name Erica and Jack.

Phoebe Buffay

Phoebe Buffay-Hannigan (Lisa Kudrow) is an odd, ditzy albeit sweet-natured masseuse who grew up homeless, sometimes telling her friends outlandish tales of life on the street. She is an aspiring musician who plays the guitar and sings songs with somewhat unusual lyrics at the coffee shop. She has an identical twin sister, Ursula Pamela Buffay (also played by Kudrow), who is just as odd as Phoebe and appeared as a recurring character on Mad About You. After a series of dates and relationships with a number of men, Phoebe meets Mike Hannigan (Paul Rudd) in season nine, whom she eventually marries in season ten. She also became a surrogate mother for her half-brother Frank Jr. (Giovanni Ribisi), giving birth to his triplets in the fifth season.

Joey Tribbiani

Joseph Francis "Joey" Tribbiani Jr. (Matt LeBlanc) is a good-natured but not-so-bright struggling actor and food lover, who becomes mildly famous for his role as Dr. Drake Ramoray on a fictionalized version of Days of Our Lives. Joey is a womanizer, with many girlfriends throughout the series, often using his catchphrase pick-up line "How you doin'?" He develops a crush on Rachel in season eight.

Prior to his role on Friends, LeBlanc appeared as a regular on the short-lived TV 101, a minor character in the sitcom Married... with Children, and as a main character in its spin-offs, Top of the Heap and Vinnie & Bobby. After Friends ended, LeBlanc portrayed Joey in a short-lived spin-off, Joey.

Chandler Bing

Chandler Muriel Bing (Matthew Perry) is an executive in statistical analysis and data reconfiguration for a large multi-national corporation. He later quits his job and becomes a junior copywriter at an advertising agency.

Chandler is known for his sarcastic sense of humor. He often teases his best friend Joey for the latter's stupidity. Chandler is often depicted as being somewhat of a hapless individual, suffering a lot of bad luck while struggling through life and occasionally struggling with an on-and-off smoking addiction. However, he eventually falls in deep mutual love with Monica and proposes to her at the close of season six, with the two of them marrying at the close of season seven. At the end of series, he and Monica adopt twins, whom they name Jack and Erica.

Like Aniston and LeBlanc, Perry had already appeared in several unsuccessful sitcom pilots before being cast. He had also starred in the TV series Second Chance and Sydney.

Ross Geller

Ross Geller (David Schwimmer) is a paleontologist at a museum of prehistory, and later a professor of paleontology at New York University. Considered by some to be the most intelligent of the six main characters, but at the same time a clumsyquirky man, Ross is known for being a smart, know-it-all who prides himself on his rationality, despite his clear hopeless romanticism. He is shown to be the most caring of all six members in various instances on the show, but also shown to be the most neurotic and his insecurities often get him into trouble.

Ross is Monica's older brother, Chandler's college roommate, and Rachel's on-again, off-again boyfriend. His first marriage has already failed by the time the show begins, with his second lasting mere weeks. The second divorce seemed to greatly depress him and make him quick-tempered near the start of season five, such as when he screams at his colleague for taking his sandwich and throwing it away. After he gets Ugly Naked Guy's apartment, he is offered to return to work, but he loses his temper again when he sees Chandler and Monica having sex through his window, becoming the last one to find out about their relationship. He also drunkenly married Rachel in Las Vegas, after which they unsuccessfully tried to annul it and had to settle for a divorce, which became Ross' third one. Ross's relationship with Rachel is a major storyline throughout the series. He is also the father of his ex-wife Carol's son, Ben, and Rachel's daughter, Emma. In the series finale, Ross and Rachel finally reconcile, deciding to be together once and for all.

The character of Ross was developed with David Schwimmer in the minds of writers and Schwimmer was also the first actor to be cast on the show.

Before being cast in Friends, Schwimmer played minor characters in The Wonder Years and NYPD Blue; his first regular series role was in the sitcom Monty. Schwimmer is the only cast member native to New York City.

Ross Geller was also voted as the best character on Friends in a poll conducted by Comedy Central UK.

Joey

Gina Tribbiani
Gina Tribbiani (Drea de Matteo) is Joey's attractive older sister, whom Joey comes to live with in Los Angeles during Joey. Temperamental, promiscuous and not particularly bright but very street-wise, Gina is a caring but over-protective and domineering mother. For years she convinced her genius son Michael that he was born when she was 22 instead of 16 years old, and always says he is the one thing she has done well. She and Joey are friends in addition to being siblings, both having the gift of being extremely appealing to the opposite sex, with numerous lovers. Initially working as a hairdresser, by season two she works as a secretary for Joey's agent Bobbie, having impressed Bobbie with her brash manner. In season two she starts dating Michael's father Jimmy once again. In the season 2 episode "Joey and the Holding Hands", it is implied that Gina may be bisexual.

Alex Garrett
Alexis "Alex" Garrett (Andrea Anders) is Joey's next-door neighbor, landlady and friend in Joey. She is an educated, but slightly ditzy, blonde lawyer who graduated from Northwestern University and Pepperdine University School of Law. Initially intimidated, but also intrigued by Joey's tough street-wise older sister Gina, the two women eventually become friends and she becomes more bold in the way she dresses and acts, thanks to Gina's influence. She is puzzled but impressed by Joey's intuitive gift at being able to know when she is wearing thong panties and spends most of her time hanging out at Joey and Michael's apartment. She and Joey bond and become close friends. Her husband is a professional orchestra musician and is away from home most of the time and she confides her problems with her marriage in Joey. At the end of season one, she and Joey become romantically involved during her separation from her husband.

In season two, Alex becomes romantically interested in Joey and has a crush on him for a long period. Gina tries to help her to get over Joey, but once Alex starts dating Joey's friend Dean, Joey soon realizes that he is also in love with Alex. Alex and Joey start dating in season 2 and shortly before the final episode they become engaged.

Matt LeBlanc and Andrea Anders dated in real life for several years after the cancellation of Joey.

Michael Tribbiani
Michael Tribbiani (Paulo Costanzo) is Joey's nephew who idolises his Uncle Joey's ability to date many women, and who himself is sheltered and nervous around girls. He is self-conscious that he has been so sheltered and that his mother Gina breast fed him until he was seven. Early in the second season of Joey it is revealed that Michael has Asperger syndrome. He is a huge Star Trek: The Next Generation and Star Wars fan. He is extremely intelligent, an aerospace engineer, attends Caltech and specialises in applied thermodynamics, works with his rival Seth frequently on engineering projects, and is an obvious direct opposite from his more street-wise mother and uncle. He turns to Joey as a big brother and substitute father figure, even after his biological father Jimmy re-enters mother Gina's love life.

Bobbie Morganstern
Roberta "Bobbie" Morganstern (Jennifer Coolidge) is Joey's oversexed agent whom he hires after Estelle Leonard's death, and reportedly the twelfth most powerful woman in Hollywood. She has an enormous crush on Joey's nephew Michael. She often entertains herself by making her office assistant do funny tricks, or shocking herself with a stun-gun. She is brash, forward, aggressive, highly entertaining and slightly ditzy, laughing at everything and at anyone's expense, including her client Joey's. She was once sued by Phil Collins.

Howard
Howard (Ben Falcone) is Joey's friend and neighbor in Joey.

Zach Miller
Zach Miller (Miguel A. Núñez Jr.) is an actor who joins the cast and becomes one of Joey's best friends in the second season of Joey. Zach has an interesting career, going from playing extras on TV, to directing amateur plays. Zach does not appear to have a home; he was seen at one time living in Joey's trailer while working on a major blockbuster movie. In one episode, Zach and Joey, both drunk, get married in Tijuana, in a parody of Ross and Rachel marrying each other in the season-five finale of Friends. Zach's final appearance was in "Joey and the Big Move". Núñez was absent from the last five episodes, including the finale of the series, because he found another job. Zach's absence within the show was not mentioned, nor was the character at all.

Characters recurring throughout series

Each of the following characters of Friends may or may not be particularly significant to the story of the series; each was introduced in one season and would usually appear in subsequent seasons.

Introduced in season 1

Gunther
Gunther (James Michael Tyler): The manager of the Central Perk coffee house, who first appears as a background character in "The One with the Sonogram at the End". He is a former actor who once played Bryce on All My Children before that character was "killed in an avalanche." Gunther develops an unrequited crush on Rachel in the third season, which he keeps to himself until "The Last One". Apart from Ross, whom he dislikes, he is on reasonably good terms with the rest of the gang despite occasionally being annoyed by wacky antics or comments from them. His motivation for disliking Ross is jealousy (as he is aware of Ross's relationship with Rachel), which is made clear numerous times, most notably in "The One with the Morning After" when he reveals to Rachel that Ross slept with another woman while Rachel was on a break from their relationship. Gunther appears in a majority of the episodes, but only occasionally calls attention to himself and almost never has a large role in the plot of an episode. In "The One With The Stain", Gunther is shown to be fluent in Dutch (although with a strong American accent), calling Ross an "ezel" as he converses with him.

James Michael Tyler was cast as Gunther because he was the only extra who could competently work the cappuccino machine on the Central Perk set. Tyler appears as Gunther in a co-host voice-over in the Friends trivia game for PS2, PC and Xbox, and in the board game Friends: Scene It?. The Seattle Times ranked Gunther as the eighth best guest character of the series in 2004. When asked in 2009 by Heatworld.com what Gunther would be doing "now", Tyler joked, "He'd probably have a very traditional marriage, with lots of white-haired babies running around with hair brighter than the sun." Aside from the main cast, he appears in the most episodes.

Jack and Judy Geller

Jack (Elliott Gould) and Judy Geller (Christina Pickles): Ross and Monica's parents. In early appearances, Jack frequently makes inappropriate comments, which he punctuates by exclaiming "I'm just saying...!", while Judy makes condescending remarks about Monica's lack of a love life and sometimes forgets her daughter even exists, while overtly favoring Ross. Jack is more balanced in his attention and care towards both Ross and Monica, though after the Gellers sell their house in season 7, it is revealed that Jack used boxes of Monica's old stuff to block rainwater from getting to his Porsche. As penance, Jack decides to gift Monica the Porsche.

Despite each of them having their own quirks, they are occasionally dumbfounded by the crazy antics of their son and daughter, such as Ross' disastrous wedding to Emily and Monica's ridiculous speech at their 35th anniversary party. They are also sometimes bemused by the antics of the other four friends, such as idiotic or crazy comments from Phoebe and Joey, a revolting trifle cooked by Rachel, and Chandler entering a coed whirlpool alongside Jack without wearing anything underneath the towel wrapped around his waist. In the season 10 episode The One With The Cake, the couple record a message for their granddaughter's 18th birthday in which they state they might not be around by then.

Pickles was nominated for the Primetime Emmy Award for Outstanding Guest Actress in a Comedy Series for her appearance in "The One Where Nana Dies Twice" in 1995. In 2004, The Seattle Times ranked Jack and Judy jointly as the second best guest characters of the series.

Barry Farber
Barry Farber (Mitchell Whitfield): Rachel's jilted fiancé. Barry, an orthodontist, decides to go on his and Rachel's honeymoon with her maid of honor Mindy, and soon begins a relationship with her. Their relationship hits a rough patch when he and Rachel consider getting back together. He decides to stay with Mindy, and the two are later married. Rachel is invited to the wedding, but receives a cold reception for jilting Barry while she is there, and a ridiculous speech from Ross which bemuses everyone in the room does not exactly improve the situation for her, until she, in a desperate attempt to salvage some pride, walks onto the stage where the microphone is and starts singing the Copacabana. In the episode "The One That Could Have Been Part 1" Rachel mentions that Barry and Mindy have divorced after five years, when Mindy found out he was cheating on her. Barry's last name is given as "Finkle" in the pilot and "Farber" in every other appearance except in "The One with the Flashback", where he is referred to as "Barry Barber". He has also been called "Barry White", and is possibly named as an homage to long-time NY talk show host Barry Farber.

Carol Willick and Susan Bunch

Carol Willick (Anita Barone for the character's debut episode, Jane Sibbett thereafter) and Susan Bunch (Jessica Hecht): Carol is Ross' lesbian ex-wife, who came out before the pilot, and Susan is her partner. Carol divorced Ross to be with Susan. In the second episode of the series, Carol tells Ross that she is pregnant with his child, and is having the baby with her partner Susan, though she wishes Ross to be part of the baby's life. Carol and Susan are often bemused by Ross' behavior throughout his onscreen appearances with them. Though Ross and Carol are on good terms after their divorce, Ross resents Susan for losing Carol to her. Although Susan and Ross are initially, naturally enough, often at odds, they briefly put aside their differences when Carol gives birth to a boy, whom they all agree, after weeks of argument, to name Ben. Carol and Susan announce their plans to get married in "The One with the Lesbian Wedding", but Carol's parents refuse to attend the wedding, leading Carol to doubt her decision. Ross initially hesitant to see his ex-wife remarry, finds himself in the position of being the one to encourage her to go ahead with the ceremony despite her parents' opposition. At the reception, Susan thanks Ross for his part in saving the wedding, and offers to dance with him; he agrees, apparently resolving their strained relationship. Carol and Susan make irregular appearances until "The One That Could Have Been" (Susan), and "The One with the Truth About London" (Carol).

Carol and Susan were based on creators Marta Kauffman and David Crane's best friends in New York: "We didn't create them for any particular political reason or because of lesbian chic. It was just an opportunity to tell a really interesting story." The characters were called a positive example of a gay couple on television by GLAAD. Jessica Hecht originally auditioned to play Monica.

Marcel
Marcel (live animal actor): A Capuchin monkey that Ross initially keeps as a pet, and who provides comic relief for his geeky master. One time Rachel loses him in the city, and calls Animal Control—only to learn from Ross that Marcel is an illegal exotic animal that cannot be kept in the city. After unsuccessfully trying to prevent animal control officer Luisa (Megan Cavanagh) from discovering that they are harboring an illegal exotic animal and bemusing her with their wacky behavior throughout these unsuccessful attempts, Rachel, Monica, Ross and Phoebe learn that Luisa is a former classmate of Rachel's and Monica's who upon recognizing Rachel attempts to spite her for snubbing her in high school by attempting to confiscate Marcel. To prevent this, Rachel threatens to tell Luisa's boss about how she shot Phoebe "in the ass with a dart" that had been meant for Marcel. Later, as Marcel sexually matures and begins to hump everything, Ross has to give him away to a zoo—"where he can have access to regular monkey-lovin'." Ultimately, Ross finds out that Marcel then got stolen from the zoo and taken into a life of show business, and—after starring in a liquor commercial—is starring in a movie in New York, where they are reunited one last time. In a later season Ross questions why he had a monkey as a pet, and in another episode is mentioned during an argument with Joey. Despite Marcel being male, in reality the monkey was a female called Katie.

Janice Litman-Goralnik

Janice Litman-Goralnik (née Hosenstein) (Maggie Wheeler): Chandler's on-again, off-again girlfriend for the first four seasons. Janice is one of the few supporting characters who appears in all of the Friends seasons (along with Gunther and Ross and Monica's parents). She has a distinctive nasal voice, a machine gun laugh, and a thick New York accent, all of which annoy the friends, especially Joey. She first appears in "The One with the East German Laundry Detergent", when Chandler breaks up with her (through Phoebe); he then invites her to New Year's in a moment of weakness, only to dump her again before midnight. She then shows up as Chandler's blind date the night before Valentine's Day where they sleep together; Chandler breaks up with her the next day but she is fine with it, telling him she knows they will meet again. In season two, in the wake of Mr. Heckles' death, Chandler resolves not to die alone and calls Janice, but is disappointed to discover that she is married and pregnant. In "The One with Barry and Mindy's Wedding", Chandler arranges a meeting with a mystery woman over the Internet, who turns out to be Janice, who reveals that her husband is having an affair with his secretary. To the surprise of the others, and to Joey's indignance, Chandler stays with Janice through the beginning of the third season, having fallen in love with her and no longer finding her annoying. Joey later sees Janice kissing her husband while in the midst of their divorce, which leads to the end of their relationship in "The One with the Giant Poking Device", as Chandler urges Janice to go back to her husband, not wanting to destroy her family. 

Following this, Janice becomes a running gag on the show, appearing in some form in one episode per season (two in season 8 when counting "The One Where Rachel Has a Baby" as two separate episodes) from season 4 onwards. When Janice returns to Chandler's life, having finally gotten divorced, Chandler finds her insufferable again, and pretends to move to Yemen to get away from her. In season five, Janice has a brief fling with Ross shortly after he has broken up with Emily, where he spends the entire date complaining about everything, causing her to find him insufferable and leave him, with the irony of the situation quickly dawning on him and persuading him to get his act together; she then implies to Joey that she will date him next. She later makes a voice cameo on a mix tape that Chandler plays for Monica, having passed it off as his own and not knowing Janice had made it for him. When Chandler and Monica become engaged, Janice re-enters their lives and, now mostly over Chandler, attempts to forcibly invite herself to the wedding; she only leaves when Monica states that Chandler still has feelings for her. When Ross and Rachel await the birth of their daughter Emma in season 8, Janice and her new, partially-deaf husband Stu are placed in the same labor room as Rachel; she gives birth to a son, Aaron, who she jokes will be Emma's future husband. She also strongly advises Rachel that Ross will not stay around to raise the baby if they are not married. In season 9, as Monica and Chandler make plans to have children, they go to a fertility clinic where Janice and Stu are coincidentally visiting; when Chandler worries about his sperm, she offers Chandler advice and support. In season 10, Janice comes close to buying a house next door to the one Monica and Chandler are buying; to get rid of her, Chandler once again pretends he still loves her, causing her to become fearful that they will end up ruining their marriages if she lives next door to him, so she decides not to buy the house after all. She leaves, seemingly for good, but does kiss him one last time before she goes.

Throughout the series, Janice enjoys spending time with the six friends, which is ironic and very inconvenient for them, since none of them can stand to be around her. She utters her catchphrase, "Ohhh—myyy—Gawd!", almost every time she re-enters the show, and Chandler sometimes imitates her with it. Janice's distinctive laugh was born out of a slip-up Wheeler made during the rehearsal of "The One with the East German Laundry Detergent"; after Chandler and Janice's "More latte?"/"No, I'm still working on mine" lines, Wheeler laughed. The Seattle Times ranked Janice as the best guest character of the series in 2004.

Mr. Heckles
Mr. Heckles (Larry Hankin): Monica and Rachel's downstairs neighbor, a domineering, highly unusual elderly man who constantly complains about the noise, even though the six friends are being perfectly decent in volume whenever he claims that they are disturbing him. His reason for this is never revealed, until "The One Where Mr Heckles Dies", in which the group discover that the noises being made in their apartment are apparently amplified in his, and when Chandler hears banging coming from the above room while in Heckles' apartment (although it is never revealed exactly what the people upstairs were doing to cause the banging) it annoys him so much that he inadvertently imitates Heckles by banging on the roof with his broom. He appears in "The One with Two Parts, Part 1" and "The One Where the Monkey Gets Away" before dying in "The One Where Mr. Heckles Dies". As a last spiteful act, he leaves all of his junk to "the noisy girls in the apartment above mine". He makes a final cameo appearance in "The One with the Flashback", set in 1993, where he complains that Phoebe's noise is disturbing his oboe practice (even though he does not actually play the oboe), and inadvertently (and cruelly) causes Joey to be Chandler's roommate. He usually states that items are his, and when the other person states that he does not have one, Mr. Heckles says that he could have one. For instance, when Rachel and Phoebe are searching for the owner of a lost cat, Mr. Heckles said "Yes, that's my cat." They told him he did not have a cat, to which he responded "I could have a cat."
He also likes to bang on the ceiling with a broom when he feels people are being too loud. This appears to be how he dies when, according to Mr. Treeger, Mr. Heckles died of a heart attack, while 'sweeping'.
His first appearance in the series was in season 1, "The One With the Blackout", where he is credited simply "as the Weird Man".

Paolo
Paolo (Cosimo Fusco): an Italian neighbor in Rachel's building, who Rachel meets and hooks up with in "The One with the Blackout". They start dating, making Ross jealous. She dumps him after he gropes Phoebe but has a last one-night stand with him in "The One with Ross's New Girlfriend". In the Italian version of the show, Paolo's name is changed to Pablo and his nationality is Spanish.

Terry
Terry (Max Wright): the original manager at Central Perk before Gunther takes the title, who does not hide the fact that he thinks Rachel is a terrible waitress and Phoebe is "so bad" as a musician. He denies Rachel an advance on her wages in "The One Where Underdog Gets Away" and hires a professional musician, Stephanie Schiffer (played by Chrissie Hynde of The Pretenders), to replace Phoebe in "The One with the Baby on the Bus". He is last mentioned in "The One Where Rachel Quits", where he asks Rachel to retake the waitress training through Gunther, and when Rachel quits midway through the training, he promptly hires a new and more experienced waitress. He presumably retires in season 4 and from this point onwards Gunther becomes the sole manager at Central Perk. The role of Terry was intended by the NBC producers to be much bigger.  They saw him as an older character who would provide advice to the six friends but NBC were talked out of it by the show's creators.

Fun Bobby
"Fun Bobby" (Robert) (Vincent Ventresca): Monica's alcoholic boyfriend. In his first appearance in "The One with the Monkey", his "fun" is sapped at Monica's New Year's party after his grandfather died, but his depression does not stop Monica, annoyed that he's "bringing her party down" from putting a party horn in his mouth and forcing him to blow on it, to his bemusement. In "The One with Russ", the gang discovers that alcohol puts the "fun" into Fun Bobby. Monica tries to wean him off drinking but regrets it when he becomes extremely boring. Monica then begins drinking on their dates, so that she could sit through his mind-numbingly dull stories. Bobby then breaks up with Monica, stating that he is not strong enough for a co-dependent relationship. It is revealed in the episode "The One with Phoebe's Husband" that the underwear on the telephone pole was Monica's when she was having sex with Fun Bobby on the terrace.

David

David, "the Scientist Guy" (Hank Azaria): a physicist with whom Phoebe falls in love in "The One with the Monkey", when he receives an academic grant for a three-year research trip to Minsk (incorrectly—and consistently—described in the scripts as being in Russia, rather than Belarus). After a quarrel with his research partner Max (Wayne Pére), Phoebe urges him to take the trip, even though it breaks her heart. Seven years later, he returns to New York for a brief visit and shares an evening with Phoebe, at the end of which he wants to say he loves her, but chooses not to as it will make it harder for him to leave. Two years later, he returns for another visit in "The One with the Male Nanny", where he kisses Phoebe before she admits she is seeing Mike Hannigan, who catches them together. He returns permanently in "The One with the Donor", having failed in his research, and when he finds out that Phoebe and Mike have broken up, he and Phoebe begin dating again. In "The One in Barbados—Part 1", David proposes to Phoebe but is turned down in favor of Mike.

In 2003, Azaria was nominated for the Primetime Emmy Award for Outstanding Guest Actor in a Comedy Series for his performance. Azaria originally auditioned for the role of Joey.

Nora Tyler Bing
Nora Tyler Bing (Morgan Fairchild): Chandler's mother, a best-selling erotic novelist whose works include Euphoria Unbound, Euphoria At Midnight and Mistress Bitch. She first appears in "The One with Mrs. Bing", where she meets the gang while on a book tour in New York. After dinner, she kisses Ross. She makes a cameo appearance in the flashback scenes of "The One with All the Thanksgivings" and later appears in "The One with Monica and Chandler's Wedding" (with Kathleen Turner as Chandler's dad) and "The One After 'I Do. The Seattle Times ranked Nora and her ex-husband jointly as the fifth best guest characters in 2004.

Ursula Buffay

Ursula Pamela Buffay (Lisa Kudrow): Phoebe's identical twin sister who lives in SoHo. Kudrow originated the role of Ursula in the sitcom Mad About You, playing her as an inept waitress at Riff's who frequently forgets orders. Ursula is every bit as odd as Phoebe is, but, unlike her sister, Ursula is a selfish, amoral, abrasive, brazen and hedonistic individual who is so self-absorbed and self-centered that she often forgets things, usually treats Phoebe with disdain and is not liked by anyone who truly knows her. Phoebe refers to Ursula as her "evil twin". She first appears in Friends in "The One with Two Parts": Chandler and Joey are eating at Riff's and mistake Ursula for Phoebe. Joey becomes attracted to Ursula and they start dating. Ursula tells Phoebe that she is bored with Joey and claims that he is smart enough to figure this out on his own without her having to actually tell him, so Phoebe pretends to be her sister to let Joey down gently. In the same episode, Helen Hunt and Leila Kenzle cameo as their Mad About You characters Jamie Buchman and Fran Devanow, in a scene where they mistake Phoebe for Ursula in Central Perk. Ursula next appears briefly in "The One with the Jam", where she is being stalked by Malcolm (David Arquette) who mistakes Phoebe for her. Phoebe naively begins a relationship with the man in question, but ends it with him when he cannot get over his obsession with Ursula. In "The One with the Jellyfish" Phoebe tells Ursula that she has met their birth mother (Teri Garr), but Ursula already knows about her. In "The One Where Chandler Can't Cry", Phoebe starts getting unwanted attention from men, and discovers that Ursula is starring in pornographic films using Phoebe's name, including a film called Buffay The Vampire Layer. Phoebe gets revenge by claiming Ursula's paychecks and embarrassing her many male fans. Flashbacks in "The One Where They All Turn Thirty" reveal that Ursula sold Phoebe's birth certificate to a Swedish runaway, and that both sisters are thirty-one, not thirty. In "The One with the Halloween Party", Ursula introduces Phoebe to Eric (Sean Penn), her fiancé. Phoebe is horrified that Ursula has lied to Eric that she is a teacher, a member of the Peace Corps, a non-smoker, and attends a church group; so she tells Eric the truth, upon which he breaks up with Ursula. The series finale of Mad About You, set 22 years into the future, reveals that Ursula becomes Governor of New York.

Mindy Hunter-Farber

Mindy Hunter-Farber (Jennifer Grey in "The One with the Evil Orthodontist", Jana Marie Hupp in "The One with Barry and Mindy's Wedding"): Rachel's maid of honor at her abortive wedding to Barry. Mindy and Rachel were best friends while growing up and their friendship is tested after Rachel discovers Mindy and Barry are seeing each other. She asks Rachel to be her maid of honor and dress in a garish pink dress. Mindy marries Barry in "The One with Barry and Mindy's Wedding"; but he later cheats on her and she has divorced him by "The One That Could Have Been, Part 1".

Ben Geller
Ben Geller (Various actors, 1995–1999; Cole Sprouse, 2000–2002): Ross and Carol's son, born during "The One with the Birth". Ben is played as an infant by Michael Gunderson, by brothers Charles Thomas Allen and John Christopher Allen from season 3 to 5, and by Sprouse from season 6 to 8.

Julie

Julie (Lauren Tom): an old graduate school colleague of Ross, whom he meets again while on a trip to China; she first appears in the final scene of the season 1 finale. They start dating but break up soon after, when Ross reveals he loves Rachel. During the entire time Julie and Ross were dating, Rachel hated the relationship because about a week before Ross came home from China, Rachel discovered that Ross was in love with her. This made Rachel's feelings for Ross grow at a fast rate, making her jealous of Julie's relationship with him. At the end "The One with Russ", Julie returns and falls in love with Ross' doppelgänger Russ, with the episodes' writer describing them as still being together by 2020. The scene where Rachel speaks slowly to Julie at the airport was based upon the real-life experience of actress Lauren Tom.

Steve
Steve (Jon Lovitz): a restaurant owner and drug addict whom Phoebe knows. In 1995, Monica tries to impress him in an attempt to get a job at his restaurant, and Phoebe tells him he is welcome to go to her apartment and try her food there, but he gets stoned on the journey there and consequently acts obnoxious. At the end of the episode, Phoebe punishes him by giving him a very painful massage. His drug problem eventually causes him to lose his restaurant, and, in 2003, Phoebe later fixes Rachel up with him (and Ross with nobody) on a blind date, as part of a secret strategy to get Rachel and Ross back together.

Ugly Naked Guy
Ugly Naked Guy (Jon Haugen): A tenant in the apartment in the building across from Monica's apartment—who frequently, perhaps invariably, is naked with the drapes open—so the gang is frequently commenting on his activities—playing cello, wearing "gravity boots", etc. He is first mentioned in the second episode of the series, but only appears twice: first, his belly and an arm are shown in "The One with the Giant Poking Device"—in which he is being poked from across the street by the gang (who think he is dead) with a long device made from chopsticks; second, a rear view of him from head to waist is shown in "The One Where Everybody Finds Out" (his final show)—in which he is moving out of his apartment and Ross tries to get the apartment by ingratiating himself with Ugly Naked Guy by cavorting with him in the nude. (In "The One with the Flashback", it is learned that he used to be "Hot Naked Guy", but then, in 1993, started putting on weight).

For many years, the identity of the actor that played him in his extremely limited appearances was a mystery. It was speculated that Michael G. Hagerty, the actor who played Mr. Treeger, was Ugly Naked Guy. However, Hagerty denied this theory. On May 31, 2016, an article was published by Todd Van Luling in The Huffington Post, detailing his search for the identity of Ugly Naked Guy. His article revealed that an actor named Jon Haugen played the role.

Introduced in season 2

Mr. Treeger
Mr. Treeger (Michael G. Hagerty): the superintendent of Monica's building, who first appears in "The One Where Heckles Dies", when he shows Mr. Heckles's lawyer to Monica and Rachel's apartment. He next appears in "The One with Phoebe's Dad", in which Ross thinks he is soliciting a bribe to fix Monica and Rachel's broken radiator (after they gave cookies instead of cash as Christmas tips and angered most of the servicepeople), when in fact Treeger actually appreciated the personal touch of the cookies. In season 4, when Joey rebuffs him for (gently) insulting Rachel in a moment of pique, he threatens to have Monica and Rachel evicted unless Joey helps him practice ballroom dancing to impress a woman. In "The One with the Free Porn", he cleans the shower drain of Chandler and Joey's newly won apartment, and warns them never to turn off their TV after they start receiving free porn. In his final on-screen appearance, he has a fireman break down the door to Monica's apartment after Joey tells him he smells gas while she and Chandler are away on their honeymoon.

Estelle Leonard
Estelle Leonard (June Gable): Joey's talent agent. She is usually seen wearing colorful clothes, heavy make-up, and a bouffant. She chain smokes and has a strong New York accent. Gable's first appearance as Estelle, in "The One with the Butt", was cut for time, though the character appears off-screen when she signs Joey and lands him his first film role, playing Al Pacino's butt-double. The cut scene is included in the episode's DVD release. Her first on-screen appearance comes in season 2's "The One with Russ", where she gets Joey a recurring part in Days of Our Lives. Although she is shown to be supportive of Joey's career throughout the show, in "The One Where Joey Loses His Health Insurance" it is suggested she has instead been bad-mouthing him after mistakenly assuming he has found another agent. She dies in the final season, and Joey speaks at her memorial service, where it is revealed that by that point she represented only two clients — Joey and a man whose act is eating paper.

When Gable auditioned for the role, she played Estelle quite plainly and was encouraged to "go away and do something with her". She returned to the audition room wearing a "fat suit" and eating a sandwich from a delicatessen, which she stubbed out a cigarette on. The performance was used in the deleted scene of "The One with the Butt". Her age is never given but Gable believed that she was in her 80s. In 2004, The Seattle Times ranked Estelle as the sixth-best guest character of the series. Gable also plays the nurse who delivers Ben in "The One with the Birth".

Richard Burke

Dr. Richard Burke (Tom Selleck): an ophthalmologist and close friend of Jack Geller. Richard is introduced when Monica caters an event for him in "The One Where Ross and Rachel … You Know"., and they begin dating despite their 21-year age difference. Ross is initially upset, but becomes supportive of their relationship, especially when Monica decides to tell their parents. This does not go well at first, but even Monica's parents have to admit that they've never seen Richard happier and that he's not just "fooling around" with a younger woman. He and Monica break up in "The One with Barry and Mindy's Wedding" when he tells her he does not want more children, his own having already grown up (and had children of their own). Despite the two still being in love, they cannot reconcile this difference, and are both devastated for months. He makes a brief voice cameo in "The One Where No One's Ready", and later they briefly attempt to rekindle their romance as "friends" before accepting that the reasons they broke up remain valid. In "The One in Vegas", Monica and Richard bump into each other off-screen and have lunch together. Monica does not feel anything for Richard but refrains from telling Chandler because of their upcoming anniversary. When he learns the truth, they fight for most of the episode until Monica assures Chandler that she will never see Richard again. In "The One with the Proposal", he runs into Monica and Chandler at dinner. While Chandler is planning to propose but pretends to be against marriage because he "wants it to be a surprise", Richard stuns Monica by telling her that he still loves her, and wants to marry her and have kids with her. Monica rejects him but later arrives at his apartment, frustrated with her own situation. She complains to him for a bit about how bad things are going in her love life before leaving to think things over. Eventually, Chandler comes to his apartment searching for Monica and tells Richard of his own proposal plan. Richard seems to lack sympathy for Chandler at first, responding to Chandler explaining away his plan to make her initially think he was against marriage by stating it had "worked very well" but when Chandler angrily tells him he has no right to ruin another man's relationship with her because he's already ruined his own, he realizes Chandler is right and tells him, "You go get her, Chandler. And can I give you a bit of advice? If you get her, don't let her go. Trust me" — noting that he hates the fact that he is a nice guy when Chandler thanks him. His apartment is put up for sale in season 9, in "The One with Ross's Inappropriate Song", but Richard is not seen. While there, Chandler finds out that Richard made a sex tape with Monica which he steals and watches, but he and Monica later discover that Richard taped over her, relieving Chandler but leaving Monica feeling insulted.

All of Selleck's entrances in season 2 had to be refilmed after the audience left because "it was like The Beatles with the screaming and the applause". Selleck was nominated for the Primetime Emmy Award for Outstanding Guest Actor in a Comedy Series in 2000 for his appearance in "The One with the Proposal". In 2004, The Seattle Times ranked Richard as the third-best guest character of the series.

Sandra Green

Sandra Green (Marlo Thomas): Rachel's overprotective mother. In "The One with the Lesbian Wedding", she announces to Rachel that she never loved Rachel's father and is divorcing him. ("You didn't marry your Barry, honey—but I married mine.") She later accompanies everyone to Carol and Susan's wedding. In "The One with the Two Parties", she arrives at Rachel's birthday party and is unaware for the whole night that her ex-husband is also there, as the six friends successfully prevent them from finding out each other are there by setting up two different parties, bemusing them both with their strange, wacky behavior in the process; Joey even ends up kissing Sandra to distract her from her ex-husband's departure. In "The One with the Baby Shower", she is invited at the last minute to attend Rachel's baby shower, where she offers to move in with Ross and Rachel to help with the baby's first months; Rachel first accepts, then Ross makes her change her mind.  When Rachel was planning to  move to Paris, Sandra would fly out with Emma a few days later.  However this never happens as Rachel chooses to remain in New York with Ross.

For her appearance in "The One with the Lesbian Wedding", Thomas was nominated for the Primetime Emmy Award for Outstanding Guest Actress in a Comedy Series in 1996.

Frances
Frances (Audra Lindley): Phoebe's grandmother by her mother Lily. Her only appearance is in "The One with Phoebe's Dad", where she reveals to Phoebe that the person in the pictures she keeps around the house is not Phoebe's father, which motivates Phoebe to try to track down her real father. When Phoebe leaves Frances’ house to go and find her father, she kisses goodbye to a picture of her "grandfather", which is in fact a picture of Albert Einstein. Though the character appears in only one episode, she is mentioned in a few more, including in season 5's "The One with Joey's Bag", where it is revealed that she has recently died and Phoebe plans her funeral. Phoebe inherits her grandmother's yellow taxi and apartment. She keeps the taxi until the very end of the series.

Frank Buffay Jr.

Frank Buffay Jr. (Giovanni Ribisi): Phoebe and Ursula's half-brother by their father. In "The One with the Bullies", Phoebe meets him after finding the courage to knock on her father's suburban door, but learns from Frank Jr.'s mother (played by Laraine Newman) that her father walked out several years ago. Despite not finding her father, she connects with Frank Jr. who later visits the city where he hits on Jasmine, one of Phoebe's coworkers, and mistakes her massage parlor for a whorehouse. He eventually falls in love with and becomes engaged to Alice Knight (Debra Jo Rupp), his former home-economics teacher who is 26 years his senior. In "The One With Phoebe's Uterus", Frank and Alice ask Phoebe to be a surrogate mother for their child, and she later gives birth to their triplets, whom she then says goodbye to in an emotional scene in "The One Hundredth". Frank makes a final appearance in "The One Where Ross is Fine", when he and the triplets meet Phoebe at Central Perk. In the episode, he claims he "hasn't slept in four years" and is so exhausted with raising the triplets he even proposed that Phoebe take one for her own. However, he soon realizes he loves his children too much to give any of them up; Phoebe proposes to start babysitting them so that Frank and Alice can enjoy some more time off.

Previously, Ribisi appeared in "The One with the Baby on the Bus" as a stranger who leaves a condom rather than money in Phoebe's guitar case when she is singing on the street, then comes back to retrieve it. It was never addressed if this was intended to be the same character as Frank, who had not yet been introduced by name.

In 2004, The Seattle Times ranked Frank as the fourth-best guest character of the series. Alice was only scheduled to appear in the one episode but was brought back for a recurring role after the surrogacy storyline—which was created when actor Lisa Kudrow became pregnant.

Leonard Green
Dr. Leonard Green (Ron Leibman): Rachel, Jill and Amy's father, a surly, abrasive and rather amoral vascular surgeon; although he is genuinely affectionate and usually good-natured towards his daughter, he is generally a mean-spirited, nasty and disrespectful bully who is quick to insult anyone who, even by accident, irritates him in the slightest way, even if an insult was not intended. He takes an instant dislike to his daughter's boyfriend Ross when the latter refers to Green's profession as "a game". Later, when Ross and Rachel conceive a child (Emma), he becomes furious that they're not engaged because he does not want his grandchild to be a bastard and ends up going to Ross' apartment and shouting at him because Rachel (who is afraid of Leonard's anger) lied to him and claimed that Ross refused to ask her to marry him, leading Rachel to eventually clarify the situation for him. However, he is still angry at her and believes love to be insignificant in a marriage. He has a heart attack in "The One Where Joey Speaks French" and is recovering in the hospital when Rachel arrives with Ross, who he once again treated with contempt.

Although Leonard, like his daughter Amy, was a deliberately unpleasant and unlikeable character, the comic relief he provided caused him, again like his daughter Amy, to become memorable as a character fans "loved to hate." As of 2020, Ron Leibman is the only one of the actors playing the group's parents to have died.

Introduced in season 3

Mark Robinson
Mark Robinson (Steven Eckholdt) first appears in "The One Where Chandler Can't Remember Which Sister", offering to get Rachel an interview at Bloomingdale's after overhearing her complaining to Monica about her current job. Ross is immediately jealous of Mark, and this, combined with Rachel's staggering obliviousness to Mark's obvious crush on her, puts a strain on their relationship, as Ross overcompensates by smothering Rachel. Although Mark quits Bloomingdale's for a different job in "The One With Phoebe's Ex-Partner", he and Rachel make plans to attend a fashion seminar together. After Ross and Rachel fight and Rachel suggests "taking a break," Mark insists, over Rachel's protests, on coming to her apartment to comfort her (doing the same thing she had been mad at Ross for doing: not listening to her wishes and doing whatever he wants); when Ross calls and overhears Mark's voice, he mistakenly believes Mark is there to have sex with Rachel and, believing that their relationship is now over, gets drunk and sleeps with Chloe. Weeks after their breakup, Mark asks Rachel on a date and she accepts, but she ultimately rejects his advances when she realizes she only accepted to get back at Ross. After saying that he will "get back at [Ross]" by himself later, Mark is not seen again until season 10, "The One with Princess Consuela", where he encounters Rachel and Ross after she has been fired from Ralph Lauren, and takes her out to dinner where he offers her a new job with Louis Vuitton in Paris. Ross fails to recognize him but becomes hostile all over again once reminded, even declaring his extreme hatred of Mark and forbids Rachel of going to dinner with him and with both of Ross and Rachel's breakups in seasons 3 and 4, oddly being unmentioned. It is also revealed that since his previous appearance he has married and had kids (twins, actually) – once informed of this, an embarrassed Ross wonders: "Should we send something?" Though Ross attempts to counter Mark's job offer by getting Rachel her job back at Ralph Lauren, he eventually relents upon realizing Rachel wants to go to Paris. However, when Ross confesses to Rachel at the airport that he is still in love with her, Rachel gets off the plane at the last minute to reunite with him, turning down Mark's job offer.

Sophie
Sophie (Laura Dean): Mark's replacement. Sophie is frequently abused by her boss Joanna and occasionally bewildered by ridiculous comments from Chandler (who had a brief relationship with Joanna). In the episode "The One Where They're Going to Party!", she is ecstatic about Joanna's death.

Joanna
Joanna (Alison LaPlaca): Rachel's boss, who despite being occasionally bewildered by his ridiculous comments, dates Chandler in two episodes (once in season 3, once in season 4). She is hostile to her assistant, Sophie, but usually good-natured towards Rachel. After deliberately sabotaging Rachel's promotion in order to keep her, she finally offers Rachel a promotion within her own department, but is knocked down and killed by a cab before she can effect it.

Doug
Douglas "Doug" (Sam McMurray): Chandler's new boss in "The One with the Ultimate Fighting Champion". Doug enjoys calling Chandler "Bing!" and slapping his male colleagues on the butt. Monica and Chandler play a game of tennis with Doug and his wife, who are left exhausted, irritated and bewildered by Monica's ridiculously overly-competitive attitude in "The One with Chandler's Work Laugh" (January 21, 1999; season 5, No. 12). In this episode, it is implied that he, his wife, and the rest of Chandler's co-workers all dislike Joey, whom Chandler claims damaged his reputation in their eyes (presumably with all his stupidity) after he invited him to a work office party, damage repaired by Monica when he invited her to a different one. In "The One with Ross's Step Forward" (airdate December 13; 2001; season 8, No. 11), he invites Monica and Chandler to dinner to celebrate his divorce. To get out of it, Chandler pretends that he wants to be on his own because he and Monica have split up but it backfires when Doug, who despite his seemingly cheerful and relieved attitude towards his divorce is in reality clearly depressed over it, tries to cheer Chandler up by taking him to strip clubs, drunkenly throwing cans at birds and throwing (Doug's) wedding ring into the gutter (Chandler had refused Doug's offer at first, but then made the mistake of thoughtlessly stating his reason for this as being that Monica would not appreciate it, only to then be forced to correct himself upon seeing Doug's confused expression). It is also revealed in this episode that he urinated on an ice sculpture during Monica and Chandler's engagement party, and this is why he was not invited to the wedding.

Bonnie
Bonnie (Christine Taylor): Phoebe's formerly bald friend, first mentioned in the episode "The One with the Candy Hearts" (although referred to as 'Abby' then), whom she sets up with Ross in "The One with the Ultimate Fighting Champion". Rachel met Bonnie two years prior to the events of this episode, and remembers her as a "weird bald chick"; however, when Rachel meets her she is horrified to see that her hair has actually grown back and she is actually a very attractive woman. Since Rachel still has feelings for Ross, she, in a successful attempt to sabotage his relationship with Bonnie, convinces her to shave her hair off again in "The One at the Beach" (airdate May 15, 1997; season 3, No. 25). She makes a brief appearance at the beginning of "The One with the Jellyfish", when Ross decides to dump her and get back together with Rachel. He implies that he made a dreadful mess of breaking up with her, both upsetting and enraging her in the process.

Phoebe Abbott

Phoebe Abbott (Teri Garr): Phoebe's birth mother. Phoebe tracks her down in "The One at the Beach", believing her to be a friend of Lily's. She reveals her parentage at the end of the episode and makes amends with Phoebe in "The One with the Jellyfish". Later, when Phoebe wants to be a surrogate mother for Frank and Alice's child, she lends Phoebe her puppy to demonstrate how difficult it is to give up children after carrying them.

The Chick and the Duck

The Chick and the Duck (live animal actors): Chandler and Joey's pet birds. In "The One With a Chick and a Duck", Joey adopts a chick from an animal sanctuary, misunderstanding a news report about people who buy chicks and then find they cannot properly care for them. Encouraged by Phoebe to return the chick, but discovering that the animals would be euthanized, Chandler, who went to give the chick back, returns home with the chick and a duck. Chandler and Joey treat the chick and the duck as their own children—at one point, Chandler punishes the duck by sending him out to the hall ("You stay out here and think about what you did!").

Chandler briefly names the chick "Yasmine", after Baywatch actress Yasmine Bleeth (the chick later, however, turns out to be a rooster, not a hen); and in "The One With Ross's Thing", Chandler refers to the possible offspring of the duck and the chick as "Dick", while Joey refers to it as "Chuck". By season 6 the animals disappeared; the duck was mentioned but not seen in season 7. In the final episode of the series, Joey bought Chandler a new duckling and chick as a housewarming gift—which Joey names "Duck Jr." and "Chick Jr."—and it is revealed that the original birds died a while ago, and Chandler, not wanting Joey to be upset about it, told him that they had gone to live on a farm, where visitors were not allowed.

Introduced in season 4

Stu
Stuart "Stu" (Fred Stoller): a waiter at the restaurant Allesandro's, where Monica gets a job in "The One Where They're Going to Party!" In "The One with the Girl from Poughkeepsie" (airdate December 18, 1997; season 4, No. 10), Stu leads a kitchen staff rebellion against Monica (his motivation being partly that she had written an extremely critical review of the restaurant's food and service in the paper prior to being hired to work there herself, which he and the rest of the staff had felt publicly humiliated by and partly that a member of his family lost his job after she replaced him as the head chef), locking her in a cold storage room and writing insults on her chef's hat. Monica hires Joey as a stooge so she can show her authority in front of the staff by firing him in front of them all, and the rebellion soon ends. In "The One with the Stripper", Stu gives Monica the phone number of someone she assumes is a stripper for Chandler's belated bachelor party, though she turns out to be a prostitute.

Emily Waltham
Emily Waltham (Helen Baxendale): The English niece of Rachel's boss Mr. Waltham, who arrives for a two-week visit to New York in "The One with Joey's Dirty Day". She has a whirlwind romance with Ross and they decide to get married. Her friendly relationship with Rachel soon changes during the wedding. The friends fly to London for their wedding in "The One with Ross's Wedding" (airdate May 7, 1998; season 4, No. 23 & 24), and Ross accidentally says Rachel's name at the altar, humiliating Emily in front of her friends and family. She aims to reconcile with him at the airport in "The One After Ross Says Rachel" (airdate September 24, 1998; season 5, No. 1) but sees Rachel with him about to go on their honeymoon and storms out again. Ross tries to convince her to move to New York. She agrees but makes him promise to get rid of everything Rachel has ever come into physical contact with, in the friends' apartments, which would be virtually impossible, and she demands that he never see Rachel again. When she learns that he's having dinner with the old gang—including Rachel—she tells him she cannot trust him and she decides to end the marriage. She makes a final voice cameo in "The One with the Ride Along", when she leaves a message on Ross's answering machine the night before her new wedding, telling him she is having second thoughts about it and is worried that they made a mistake splitting up. Rachel accidentally deletes the message, but tells Ross about it and convinces him not to respond to it. Emily's surname is that of the city where both creators of the show attended college.

Patsy Kensit was originally approached to play the role but turned it down. Emily and Ross's marriage was intended to last much longer in the series, but Helen Baxendale became pregnant prior to season 5 and was unable to travel for the show; hence, her limited appearances after season 4. Helen Baxendale was asked to reprise the role in season 10, but turned it down to star in the West End play After Miss Julie, and because she did not want the same level of tabloid attention she received in 1998.

Stephen and Andrea Waltham

Stephen (Tom Conti) and Andrea Waltham (Jennifer Saunders): Emily's father and shrewish stepmother, introduced in "The One with Ross's Wedding, Part 2". Their marriage is icy and they openly treat one another with disdain. They are equally hostile towards Jack and Judy Geller when the Gellers refuse to pay for their house to be remodelled after the wedding reception. When the wedding takes place, like all of the guests they are shocked and utterly dumbfounded when Ross accidentally says Rachel's name instead of Emily's during the vows. In "The One After Ross Says 'Rachel'", Stephen angrily tells Ross that consequently Emily has gone into hiding after escaping out of the bathroom window and now feels humiliated, but this does not stop Andrea from telling Ross in front of him that she thinks he (Ross) is "delicious". Andrea's final words onscreen are, to Ross, "Call me." Stephen's final words onscreen, to Andrea in response to her flirting with Ross, are "You spend half your life in the bathroom-why don't you ever go out the bloody window?!"

Jennifer Saunders co-star in Absolutely Fabulous, June Whitfield, makes a cameo appearance as the Waltham's housekeeper in "The One With Ross's Wedding".

Introduced in season 5

Mr. Zelner
Mr. Zelner (Steve Ireland): an executive at Polo Ralph Lauren, who interviews Rachel while at the same time finding her quirks hard to deal with in "The One with Rachel's Inadvertent Kiss". After Rachel is promoted in season 7, he becomes a recurring character. In "The One with Princess Consuela", he fires Rachel after overhearing her interview with a Gucci representative. Ross tries to get Rachel her job back by bribing Zelner: Zelner has a son called Ross who likes dinosaurs. Ross says his name is "Ron", shocked to hear that Zelner's son is also named Ross.

Kim
Kim (Joanna Gleason): a colleague of Rachel's at Polo Ralph Lauren. In "The One Where Rachel Smokes", Rachel thinks she is missing out on important decisions, as they are always made when Kim takes a smoking break. She tries to take up smoking so she can stay in the loop but is unsuccessful when Kim, initially bewildered by Rachel's wacky behavior throughout her attempts to join her while she is smoking, threatens to fire her if she keeps damaging her health. Later, Kim thinks Rachel kissed Ralph Lauren in order to take her job, when it was really Phoebe who kissed "Kenny the copy guy". After unsuccessfully trying to deny the affair, Rachel pretends Ralph dumped her. Kim believes her when she sees what she thinks is a cold look from Ralph (appearing as himself) in the elevator.

Introduced in season 6

Note: All characters who were introduced in this season did not re-appear in further seasons. Consequently, they are listed in the section on this page "Only in season 6".

Introduced in season 7

Tag Jones

Tag Jones (Eddie Cahill): Rachel's inexperienced but attractive new assistant at Polo Ralph Lauren. She hires him after being promoted, not because he is the best choice for the job but because she is smitten with him. After he also becomes interested in her they try to keep their relationship a secret from her boss Zelner; otherwise Tag's employment would be a conflict of interest. In "The One Where They All Turn Thirty" Rachel breaks up with Tag when she realizes that their six-year age difference makes him too young and immature for her to be dating if she intends to follow her marriage schedule. He reappears in "The One with the Red Sweater" in season eight when Phoebe thinks he is the father of Rachel's unborn baby. He tells Rachel that he has matured a lot since their break-up and wants to resume their relationship, but backs off when he finds out she is pregnant by someone else. He later meets up with Ross—who is the real father and is wearing the same kind of red sweater.

Charles Bing/Helena Handbasket 

Charles Bing/Helena Handbasket (Kathleen Turner): Chandler's gay drag-queen father and Nora's ex-husband, regularly referred to as an unseen character in previous seasons. Determined to invite him to their wedding in "The One with Chandler's Dad", Monica drags Chandler to Charles' burlesque show in Las Vegas, where he is seen for the first time, performing under the name "Helena Handbasket". Chandler invites him to the wedding, and he and Nora walk Chandler down the aisle in "The One with Monica and Chandler's Wedding, Part 1". He does not appear at the reception in "The One After 'I Do, though a deleted scene reveals he is upstairs crying after Joey accidentally ruined his dress.

Introduced in season 8

Emma

Emma Geller-Green (Cali Sheldon & Noelle Sheldon): Rachel and Ross' infant daughter. Though Ross had originally wanted to name his daughter "Isabella", Rachel wound up in tears when she decided that the name did not suit the baby and was dismayed by her other remaining choice, Delilah. Monica graciously suggests "Emma", the name she had chosen for her own future daughter when she was fourteen, but concedes that since "Nothing goes with 'Bing', so I'm screwed," Rachel can give the name to her own daughter.

Introduced in season 9

Mike Hannigan

Michael "Mike" Hannigan (Paul Rudd): Phoebe's boyfriend and later husband: in "The One with the Pediatrician" (airdate October 10, 2002; season 9, No. 3), Joey and Phoebe decide to go on a double date, promising to fix each other up with blind dates. However, Joey forgets about Phoebe's date, and wanting to prevent her from discovering this when she enquires about the name of the man he has fixed her up with, he pretends that someone called "Mike" will be her date. He then enters the coffee shop and desperately yells "Mike!" Mike Hannigan replies and is roped into the date, which does not go well as Mike accidentally makes it clear that he does not actually know Joey personally, and Joey tries to recover the situation,  consequently upsetting Phoebe and turning off his own blind date Mary-Ellen in the process. Mike feels sorry for Phoebe as he watches her leave and when he spots her again in the coffee shop the next day, he speaks to her and explains that he allowed himself to be roped into the date "because I was told that I'd get a free dinner-which I didn't-and that I'd meet a pretty girl-which I did." A flattered Phoebe does not turn him down when he asks her out on a second date, which is equally bad thanks to Ross, who accidentally upsets Phoebe before it can begin, causing her to spend rather a lot of the night crying on Mike's shoulder. Ross goes to Mike's house and tries to explain to him that he had accidentally upset Phoebe, which sets off a chain of ridiculous events that result in Mike ultimately deciding he has feelings for Phoebe, and eventually, they decide to move in together; Phoebe suggests that one day they could get married but he tells her that, after his messy divorce, he never wants to get married again, which results in them breaking up. Emotionally unable to be apart from each other, they reconcile in "The One with the Memorial Service" (airdate March 13, 2003; season 9, No. 17). In "The One in Barbados, Part 1", Monica summons Mike to Barbados, where he proposes to Phoebe at the same time as David. She turns both men down but admits that Mike is the man she wants to be with. Subsequently, Mike has to break up with Precious (Anne Dudek), the girl he has been seeing since breaking up with Phoebe, but Phoebe (who annoys Precious by calling her "Susie") convinces Precious to dump him instead. In "The One Where Rachel's Sister Babysits" (airdate October 30, 2003; season 10, No. 5), he proposes to her, and they are married soon after by Joey. When Phoebe briefly changes her name to "Princess Consuela Bananahammock", he suggests changing his name to "Crap Bag" making her change it back. He makes a brief appearance in "The Last One", bringing over a "Welcome to the World, Baby Bing" banner to Monica and Chandler's and tells Phoebe that he also wants to have a baby, to which Phoebe agrees.

Theodore and Bitsy Hannigan

Theodore and Bitsy Hannigan (Gregory Itzin and Cristine Rose): Mike's rich, haughty parents. He introduces Phoebe to them, and soon after they make it clear that they do not approve of Phoebe due to being both irritated and bewildered by her odd quirks, but Mike defies them and declares his love for her in front of his parents and their two "sinfully boring" friends (who are likewise bemused by the odd quirks of Phoebe). They later meet Joey, who confuses and bemuses them with his comments about how nice it is that "their little ones are growing up" (Phoebe had told him he was "like a dad" to her) and later attend the wedding in "The One with Phoebe's Wedding". His father “crushes a pill” into his wife's drink at the wedding so that she does not create a scene and she appears happy and carefree.

Amy Green

Amy Green (Christina Applegate): one of Rachel's two sisters, who first appears in "The One with Rachel's Other Sister" (airdate November 21, 2002; season 9, No. 8). She arrives at Monica and Chandler's for Thanksgiving dinner, where she is annoyed that she would not get custody of Emma if Rachel and Ross died. A boorish, hedonistic, brazen, dimwitted, amoral, materialistic and utterly unlikeable bully who could not care less about other people's feelings, she greatly irritates the friends with her cruelly honest opinions of them and selfish, self-absorbed attitude; though seems a little afraid of Monica, convinced that she is crazy (after witnessing Monica's bizarre rules when it comes to eating off the china plates she and Chandler received as a wedding present). When Rachel and Amy later have a fight after the former feels the latter has insulted Emma, which results in them accidentally breaking one of Monica's plates (causing her to nearly pass out), Chandler firmly tells both of them off as a father would do, and demands that Amy apologise for ruining Thanksgiving, for which she does. He then later hints to her that their fight was "a major turn-on". Rachel also makes up with Amy after offering to let her use her Ralph Lauren employee discount.

Amy appears again in "The One Where Rachel's Sister Babysits", where she tells Rachel that she plans to marry her ex-boyfriend's father, who is rich. However, upon Rachel's advice to try to make it on her own, Amy calls off her engagement and sleeps over at Joey and Rachel's apartment. Rachel tries to teach her responsibility by letting her babysit Emma (who Amy calls 'Ella', insisting it is prettier), and tries to convince her to stop being so selfish and do something nice for another person. Eventually, Amy decides to take Rachel's advice and do something nice for Emma. Only trouble is, the utterly self-absorbed and self-centered Amy decides to get Emma's ears pierced. Ross and Rachel are horrified and angry at Amy, especially as she reveals she plans on becoming a baby stylist. However, Amy and Rachel make up at the end of the episode when they gossip about their sister Jill gaining a ton of weight. This was an oblique reference to Reese Witherspoon (who played Jill) being pregnant.

Although Amy, like her father Leonard, was a deliberately unpleasant and unlikeable character, the comic relief she provided caused her to, again like her father Leonard, become memorable as a character that fans "loved to hate". In 2003, Applegate won the Primetime Emmy Award for Outstanding Guest Actress in a Comedy Series for her appearance in "The One with Rachel's Other Sister" and was nominated again for her appearance in "The One Where Rachel's Sister Babysits".

Charlie Wheeler

Charlie Wheeler (Aisha Tyler): an attractive paleontology professor (goes to Woodroffe school) whom Ross falls for in "The One with the Soap Opera Party" (airdate April 24, 2003; season 9, No. 20). He plans to ask her out, but is too late when she gets together with Joey instead. Initially angry, he eventually accepts Joey and Charlie's relationship and helps Joey come up with intelligent places to take her on dates in "The One with the Fertility Test". At Ross's conference in "The One in Barbados", Charlie tells Joey that they have nothing in common and breaks up with him. She and Ross then get together. In "The One with Ross's Grant" (airdate November 6, 2003; season 10, No. 6), she breaks up with Ross and gets back together with her old flame, Dr. Benjamin Hobart (Greg Kinnear).

The character of Charlie was created in part to counter criticism the Friends production staff had received for featuring too few characters played by ethnic minority actors. Aisha Tyler was only the second major supporting character to be portrayed by a black actress, following Gabrielle Union's appearance as Kristen Lang in "The One with the Cheap Wedding Dress" (airdate March 15, 2001; season 7, No. 17). The role was not specifically written for a black actor. Tyler told the St Petersburg Times, "I hope [people's] frustration over [the lack of diversity] is tempered by the fact that when they wrote this role, they didn't wimp out. They wrote her so smart and sexy and elevated, she wasn't just the black girl on Friends."

Introduced in season 10

Erica
Erica (Anna Faris): a young girl from Cincinnati who decides to let Monica and Chandler adopt her baby in "The One with the Birth Mother" (airdate January 8, 2004; season 10, No. 9). She visits New York in "The One Where Joey Speaks French" and sees the tourist sites with Monica and Chandler. She goes into labor at the end of "The One with Rachel's Going Away Party" and gives birth to twins Erica and Jack in "The Last One".

Jack and Erica Bing

Jack and Erica Bing—the adopted son and daughter of Monica and Chandler, born in "The Last One". They were portrayed by Cristobal and Antonella. It is revealed that Monica and Chandler did not know they would be having twins until they were born. Chandler suggests giving one of them up but Monica refuses, saying, "We cannot split them up. They're our children and they're coming with us."

Missy Goldberg
Missy Goldberg (Ellen Pompeo): a woman from Ross' and Chandler's college, at which they both made a pact to not ask her out so it would not damage their friendship, introduced in "The One Where the Stripper Cries" (airdate February 5, 2004; season 10, No. 11). At a reunion, Chandler gives Ross permission to break the pact, now that he is married, where it is revealed that Chandler and Missy made out numerous times during college after school hours in the school's science labs, which Ross calls his "turf".

Benjamin Hobart
Benjamin Hobart (Greg Kinnear): Nobel Prize–winning paleontologist and ex-boyfriend of Ross' girlfriend Charlie Wheeler, introduced in "The One with Ross's Grant". After seeing Charlie again for the first time in an apparently long while and meeting Ross for the first time (who bemuses him with ridiculous comments) he eventually confesses to Ross he is still in love with her and then unsuccessfully tries to persuade Ross to break up with her. When Ross refuses, Benjamin comes to resent him and displays this resentment by asking utterly ridiculous questions at the grant interview. He and Charlie eventually get back together, after Ross makes him confess his actions in front of her.

Amanda Buffamonteezi
Amanda Buffamonteezi (Jennifer Coolidge): an annoying lady who used to live in the building before moving to England. She picks up a fake English accent and claims to have slept with Evel Knievel. Her inflated ego and utterly self-absorbed attitude cause Monica and Phoebe to find her insufferable, but since they do not want to hurt the nonetheless good-natured Amanda's feelings, they agree to meet up with her in the coffee shop after Chandler ruins their original plan not to take any of her phone calls by doing exactly that and informing her that they are in the house with him, and then bemuses her by informing her that he takes pedicures before handing the phone to Monica.

Jennifer Coolidge also appears in the spin-off series Joey playing his agent.

Roy
Roy (Danny DeVito): a stripper in "The One Where the Stripper Cries", who is hired for Phoebe's bachelorette party at the last minute after she expresses disappointment that the party is not "dirtier". Put under pressure to quickly hire a stripper by Phoebe (who had forgotten to ask them to hire one prior to when the party actually began) they look through the phone book and call the first stripper whose number they discover, asking him to quickly arrive at Monica's apartment where the party is taking place. When he turns up, the girls are surprised to see that he is at least 50 years old, but also delusional about his physical appearance, as he clearly has trouble accepting the fact that he has not aged gracefully and is not physically appealing to women anymore. When he sees that Phoebe is not enjoying his performance he gets annoyed, particularly when she claims while cringing that "this is how (she) looks when (she's) turned on." They have an argument over whether or not he should be paid for arriving after a rather difficult and rushed journey to the apartment on his part, and when she refuses to allow a sympathetic Rachel and Monica to pay him and also insults him, the sensitive stripper gets upset and cries as he is forced to accept the fact that he is no longer physically attractive, but stripping is all he knows. In her guilt, Phoebe comforts him and tells him that he should teach stripping instead. At her insistence, he then performs one last time for the party.

Mackenzie
Mackenzie (Dakota Fanning): the daughter of the current residents of the house Monica and Chandler buy. She winds up helping Joey deal with his anxieties about Chandler and Monica moving out of the city. As a bit of revenge for Joey's overanxious behavior, Monica and Chandler briefly pretend that Mackenzie is a ghost.

Characters appearing in only one season
Each of the following characters of Friends, portrayed by a celebrity, may or may not be particularly significant to the story

Only in season 1

Joseph Tribbiani Sr. and Gloria Tribbiani 

In "The One with the Boobies" (airdate January 19, 1995; season 1, No. 13), Joey finds out that his father, Joey Sr. (Robert Costanzo), is having an affair with another woman, Ronni (Lee Garlington). Joey (the son) tries to set things right, but Gloria (Brenda Vaccaro), Joey's mother, who secretly knew about the affair all along, makes Joey change it back because her husband's been unusually nice to her since he started cheating on her.

Though Joey's parents do not appear on the show again, Joey Sr. later makes an appearance on the spin-off series Joey, making Costanzo the only actor, besides Matt LeBlanc, to reprise his role from Friends on the series.

Drs. Michael Mitchell and Jeffrey Rosen 

Drs. Michael Mitchell (George Clooney) and Jeffrey Rosen (Noah Wyle): Two doctors whom Rachel and Monica meet at a hospital and go on a date with. Monica and Rachel pretend to be each other for health insurance purposes—eventually causing things to go wild. Dr. Mitchell later saves the life of Ross's monkey, Marcel, who swallows alphabet tiles from a Scrabble game and nearly chokes to death. (Clooney and Wyle were also cast as physicians on the NBC medical drama ER when they appeared together on Friends.)

Jill Goodacre Connick 

Jill Goodacre Connick (herself) gets trapped with Chandler in an ATM vestibule in "The One with the Blackout". Chandler uses her cell phone to tell Joey and the others, engages in awkward conversion with her, and plays a "spin the phone pen over your head" game with her.

Alan 
Alan (Geoffrey Lower) is Monica's boyfriend in "The One with the Thumb". Everyone likes him more than Monica does. At the end of the episode Monica breaks up with him, and has the break-up talk with the other friends as if they broke up with him, too. The irony is that Alan is relieved when Monica breaks up with him as [he] 'just can't stand your friends'.

Lydia 
Lydia (Leah Remini): a single mother-to-be whose childbirth Joey assists before Carol gives birth to Ben. Their conversations mostly revolve around whose favored basketball team is better, the Boston Celtics (Lydia) or New York Knicks (Joey). In the end, the father of Lydia's baby arrives, and Joey leaves them alone. Remini had originally auditioned for the role of Monica.

Roger 
Roger (Fisher Stevens): a psychiatrist who Phoebe dates in "The One with the Boobies". The other friends take a swift dislike to him after he (very accurately) diagnoses their unconscious needs and foibles—such as Chandler's intimacy issues and Ross' guilt over being favored over Monica by their parents—and their narcissistic group dynamic. Phoebe breaks up with him, having joined the others in hating him; he is never seen again, but is mentioned in the following episode ("The One with the Candy Hearts") when Phoebe calls him because "it's nice to have a date on Valentine's Day"—essentially confirming what he said about her neediness and clinginess.

Only in season 2

Caroline Duffy 
Caroline Duffy (Lea Thompson): a cartoonist. Reprising her role from Caroline in the City, she talks with Joey and Chandler—seeing them with Ben and consequently thinking them to be lovers—in "The One with the Baby on the Bus".

Eddie Manoick 
Eddie Manoick (Adam Goldberg): Chandler's roommate after Joey moves into his own apartment, having landed the recurring role Dr. Drake Ramoray on Days of Our Lives. Chandler quickly realizes they have nothing in common: Eddie hates Baywatch, foosball, and sports in general. When they seem to be successfully bonding, Eddie reveals his disturbed inner thoughts, and begins to show signs of mental illness, such as stealing mannequin heads from Macy's and obsessively dehydrating fruit. In "The One Where Dr. Ramoray Dies", he suspects Chandler of both having sex with his ex-girlfriend Tilly and killing his goldfish. He later forgets these events, but Chandler demands he move out after learning that Eddie watches him sleep. Eddie agrees to leave but later denies the conversation took place, instead believing that he and Chandler took a weekend road trip to Las Vegas. Chandler ultimately gets rid of Eddie by allowing Joey to move back in after Joey's career falters following the death of Dr. Ramoray. They change the locks, move Eddie's stuff out into the hall, and pretend that Eddie never lived there; confused, Eddie leaves and is never seen again.

Adam Goldberg later appeared in the second season of Joey as Jimmy Costa, the biological father of Joey's nephew, Michael.

Rob Donnan 
Rob Donnan (Chris Isaak): Rob asks Phoebe to sing for the children at a library, but the parents are horrified by her morbidly honest lyrics. However, the kids like the songs and come to the café to listen to her, and Phoebe teaches Rob "Smelly Cat". Isaak's song "Wicked Game" plays in the background when Rachel and Ross sleep together for the first time ("The One Where Ross and Rachel...You Know").

Zoo staff 

The Zoo Administrator (Fred Willard) of the zoo Ross sent Marcel to, who tries to cover up a break-in in which Marcel is kidnapped and forced into show business. When Ross visits the zoo to visit Marcel, the administrator lies and tells Ross that Marcel has died. Ross later learns the truth about what happened from an unusual janitor (Dan Castellaneta), an unusual man with a strange fascination for the animals in the zoo.

Susie Moss 
Susie "Underpants" Moss (Julia Roberts): an old childhood friend of Chandler, who's working on the production of a movie, and with whom Chandler has a colored history: when they were in elementary school, Chandler pulled up Susie's skirt when she was on stage, revealing her underwear to the entire school, and she never lived it down until she graduated high school. They arrange a date, Chandler unsuspecting that it is a plot to get revenge. After convincing him to wear her panties, Susie takes him out to dinner, undresses him in the men's room, and takes off with his clothes—leaving him in a bathroom stall wearing nothing but her panties. She is never seen again. Julia Roberts and Matthew Perry briefly dated in real life.

Jean-Claude Van Damme 
Jean-Claude Van Damme (himself):
an actor in the movie Susie's producing, over whom Rachel and Monica compete for attention. Monica has a crush on him but is too shy to ask him out; so Rachel attempts to on her behalf, but he says he'd rather go out with her (Rachel). Rachel asks Monica for permission, which she unhappily gives. After Rachel goes on the date with him it causes a fight between her and Monica that ends with Rachel telling Monica that she will not see him anymore, so that Monica can go out with him.  When Monica goes on her date with him, she finds out he only agreed to go out (with Monica) because Rachel told him that Monica was "dying to have a threesome with him and Drew Barrymore". Monica immediately dumps him. When she gets home she and Rachel fight again, but this time end up apologizing to each other, agreeing they should not have let him come between them. He is last seen being greatly irritated – along with everyone else on the studio set – by Joey's stupidity while trying to act alongside him.

Erika Ford 
Erika Ford (Brooke Shields): a mentally ill stalker who thinks that Joey is actually Dr. Drake Ramoray, the character he plays on Days of Our Lives. Despite this, Joey goes on a date with her. She dumps him when she suspects "Drake" is cheating on her with another woman (actually another character in the soap opera). He tries to explain that "It's a TV show!" and "I'm not Drake!", but she does not understand, so Ross tells her Joey's "Hans Ramoray", Drake's "evil twin"—and Joey tells her to go to Salem to find the "real" Drake Ramoray. She is never seen again afterwards.

Ryan 
Ryan (Charlie Sheen) arrives in New York on leave from the Navy to see Phoebe, who has chicken pox at the time. He is bewildered to see Phoebe covering her head with a scarf, trying to disguise the fact that she has chicken pox; eventually convincing her to admit this to him, he decides he cannot stand to be apart from her and consequently catches chicken pox from her and they both spend the rest of the time sick and trying to not scratch at the sores.

Duncan Sullivan 
Duncan Sullivan (Steve Zahn) is a Canadian ice dancer that Phoebe married in order to allow him to get a Green card. While Phoebe believed him to be homosexual, he returned to ask Phoebe for a divorce because he has realized he is straight and has proposed to another woman. After witnessing and being bewildered by Rachel's antics with a pigeon (after she trapped it inside a saucepan), he admits to Phoebe the truth about his sexuality.

Russ 
Russ (David Schwimmer; credited as "Snaro") is the first man Rachel dates after Ross. A slightly-taller doppelgänger of Ross, Russ is a dentist. While both Ross and Rachel are initially oblivious to Russ' resemblance to Ross, Rachel finally notices after the duo get into an argument over what defines a "doctor". In the final scene of the episode, "The One with Russ", Russ reveals to Phoebe and Chandler that Rachel had broken up with him. As Russ wonders what he will do with his life, Ross' own ex-girlfriend Julie enters and meets eyes with Russ, the two instantly falling in love, and leaving Central Perk together. In 2019, Lauren Tom described the couple as still being together by that year.

Only in season 3

Chloe 
Chloe (Angela Featherstone):  First mentioned (though only as "the girl from the copy place") in "The One with the Princess Leia Fantasy" and "The One with the Jam", and first seen in "The One Where Ross and Rachel Take a Break", when Chloe (almost effortlessly) seduces Ross after he and Rachel have a fight and he believes she (Rachel) is sleeping with Mark. Ross tries to get her out of his apartment quickly the next day (in "The One with the Morning After") after hearing a voice message from Rachel rescinding their "break", but Chloe is still there (albeit hidden) when Rachel arrives. Later, Ross is unable to stop the "trail" of gossip leading from Chloe to Rachel, and the latter learns of their tryst, leading to their breakup.

Pete Becker 

Pete Becker (Jon Favreau): a computer software genius and multi-millionaire, Pete is introduced when he tips Monica $20,000 at the Moondance diner in "The One with the Hypnosis Tape", which she assumes is a joke. He asks her out for a pizza, and takes her to Rome. Monica worries about the fact that she is not attracted to him and cannot figure out why. When Pete offers her a job in his restaurant, she turns him down, not wanting to hurt his feelings, but a goodbye kiss from Pete finally awakens her feelings. Monica thinks he is going to propose in "The One with Ross's Thing"; instead, he tells her he wants to become an Ultimate Fighting Champion. He gets badly beaten by Tank Abbott, and every other fighter he encounters, and Monica reluctantly ends their relationship after he refuses to quit despite his increasingly debilitating injuries.

The character of Pete was conceived as "a Bill Gates billionaire genius scientist-type" to whom Monica was not attracted. The producers and casting director had difficulty finding an actor to play Pete as they wanted, "someone who was appealing enough that we liked him, so we could root for him, but on the other hand, wasn't so drop-dead male model gorgeous that we would go, 'What's your problem?' to Monica when she didn't fall for him."

Kate Miller 
Kate Miller (Dina Meyer): Joey's co-star in the play Boxing Day. Joey falls for her, and she sleeps with him, but she is already dating the director, Marshall Townend, and sees Joey as a one-night stand. The director dumps her when the play performs poorly with critics, and she gets together with Joey in "The One with the Screamer". Joey is distraught when she leaves for a soap opera role in Los Angeles. In the season 9 episode "The One in Barbados (1)", Joey and Rachel, in hopes of getting into the pharmaceutical convention, use fake IDs; Rachel uses the pseudonym "Kate Miller".

Marshall Townend 
Marshall Townend (Reg Rogers): the overly dramatic, self-absorbed director of Boxing Day, who is dating Kate. He and everyone else involved in making the play (apart from Lauren) make fun of Joey after Kate outs him as having appeared on an infomercial as a man too idiotic to open a milk carton. He later dumps Kate after she (and the play) gets bad reviews.

Vince and Jason 
Vince (Matt Battaglia) is a fire fighter and Jason (Robert Gant) is a kindergarten teacher.  Phoebe dates both men for some time before they find out about each other, and both break up with Phoebe.

Lauren 
Lauren (Jennifer Milmore): Kate's understudy in Boxing Day. She is a big fan of Joey from his role as Dr. Drake Ramoray, and ends up sleeping with him. Joey dumps her after sleeping with Kate, and although she is initially upset (calling him "pig"), she later seems to be fine with him. She takes over the role of "Adrienne" in the play after Kate leaves for Los Angeles.

Jennifer Milmore was the "author" of the improvement book Be Your Own Windkeeper which the girls read in a season 2 episode. Jennifer is married to Friends writer Gregory S. Malins.

Tommy (The Screamer) 

Tommy "the Screamer" (Ben Stiller): an aggressive bully who explodes into anger at the slightest irritation, only to immediately revert to normal behavior, in an episode fittingly titled "The One With The Screamer". He is introduced as Rachel's last-minute date to one of Joey's plays, as she decides she needs one to balance Ross's; Ross sees him scream at an elderly couple who were accidentally in his and Ross' seats, and later screams at Ross because the latter almost spilt his coffee on him. Ross tries to warn Rachel and the other friends, but they do not believe him, assuming he's just jealous. However, Tommy's true colours are exposed when all six friends see him lose his temper after Joey and Chandler's pet baby chicken urinates in his hand and he screams at both it and their pet duck. Accepting, to his own chagrin, that the others are now afraid of him, he breaks up with Rachel and is never seen again.

Isabella Rossellini 
Isabella Rossellini (herself): Rossellini visits Central Perk at the end of the episode "The One With Frank Jr." One of the episode's plotlines involved Ross and Rachel compile lists, each of 5 people (celebrities) they can have sex with; Rossellini was originally on Ross' list, but he replaces her with Winona Ryder because Rossellini is "international", and thus will never be around...only to see Rossellini herself. Rachel encourages Ross to pursue her, knowing he'll get shot down; Rossellini is somewhat charmed and intrigued by Ross's "list," but leaves after seeing that she is not on the final version (quipping that she has a list of five coffee house guys, but she has just bumped Ross off her list).

Tomas and Tim 

Tomas (Robin Williams) and Tim (Billy Crystal): two strangers at the coffee shop. Appearing at the beginning of "The One with the Ultimate Fighting Champion", they perform a superfluous skit while sitting on the group's sofa at Central Perk. Tomas confides to Tim that he thinks his wife is cheating on him with her gynaecologist, causing the friends stop trying to have their own conversation and eavesdrop. Eventually Tim reveals how he's sleeping with Tomas' wife; bursting into tears, Tomas starts shouting at and insulting Tim, and leaves the shop in a loud fury, followed by Tim, who gives the six shocked, bewildered friends one last embarrassed, apologetic look before he leaves. Robin Williams and Billy Crystal were filming nearby and adlibbed all their lines, and were uncredited.

Only in season 4

Kathy 
Kathy (Paget Brewster): Joey's girlfriend, introduced in "The One with Joey's New Girlfriend" (airdate October 30, 1997; season 4, No. 5). A mutual attraction soon develops between Kathy and Chandler, which manifests in a kiss; Kathy then breaks up with Joey, without telling him why. After Chandler reveals the truth, Joey is outraged and decides to move out,  but has a change of heart after hearing Kathy's feelings for Chandler, and she and Chandler get together. Although Chandler is initially uncomfortable about the possibility of their relationship becoming sexual as he would be directly compared to Joey, Monica and Rachel are able to give Chandler some pointers. Sometime later, Chandler goes to see Kathy in a play and becomes jealous of her steamy onstage sex scenes with her co-star, Nick. Chandler starts to suspect that she is cheating on him; when he confronts her about it, she leaves, offended, and Chandler assumes the worst. Realizing that he has come to the wrong conclusion, Chandler arrives at Kathy's apartment the next morning to apologize to her, only to find Nick's pants, and they break up.

When Paget Brewster arrived for her audition, she believed she was the "runty alternate" and did not have a chance of getting the part. Matthew Perry later told her that the producers knew she was right for the role when she called herself a "runt". She spent her first two weeks working on the show believing that she would be fired and the part recast with a better looking actress. Brewster did not want Kathy to be written out by cheating on Chandler; Aniston, Cox, and Kudrow agreed with her and tried to persuade the producers to have Kathy tour in a play instead.

Charlton Heston 
Charlton Heston (himself): actor in a movie with Joey. Joey reeks from spending a day fishing without showering after, so he uses Heston's shower—only to be caught by Heston. Joey tries to explain that he "stinks"—which Heston infers to refer to his acting, not his smell—and Heston gives Joey an actor's pep talk before telling him that "no matter how badly you think you stink, you must never break into my dressing room and use my shower!"

The Salesman 
The Salesman (magician Penn Jillette) attempts to sell a set of encyclopedias to Joey, sitting down with him and showing him some entries in the "V" volume. The entire set of 20 costs $1500, and when Joey informs him that he only has $50, he offers Joey a choice of one volume; Joey buys "V".

Cheryl 
Cheryl (Rebecca Romijn): a woman whom Ross dates for a single episode, finding that she keeps an incredibly filthy apartment overrun with rats and fleas, yet finds Ross's own apartment disgusting due to a "weird smell" (which Ross quips may be soap). He attempts to form a relationship with her, but cannot overcome her slovenly lifestyle. Later, Monica arrives at the apartment asking to clean Cheryl's apartment, as she cannot sleep thinking about it.

Joshua Burgin 
Joshua Burgin (Tate Donovan): a recently divorced customer who regularly uses Rachel as a personal shopper at Bloomingdale's. They start dating but break up in "The One with All the Wedding Dresses" (airdate April 16, 1998; season 4, No. 20) when Rachel, reeling from Ross' engagement to Emily, proposes to Joshua after just four dates. Joshua appeared after the time that Jennifer Aniston and Tate Donovan were dating each other in real life.

Chip Matthews 
Chip Matthews (Dan Gauthier), who attended Lincoln High School with Rachel, Monica and Ross, and is described as being the most popular boy in school. His first brief appearance is actually on a Geller home video in "The One with the Prom Video" (airdate February 1, 1996; season 2, No. 14) as Rachel's prom date; he is played by an unknown, uncredited actor and his face is not seen onscreen. He fully appears in the episode "The One with the Cat" (airdate October 2, 1997; season 4, No. 2), when Monica goes on a date with him and we learn that, on the night of their prom, he cheated on Rachel. Monica's high school dream is soon shattered when she realizes that Chip is still mentally a teenager: he has not matured or done anything to better himself since high school, still hangs out with the same friends, plays immature pranks on people, lives with his parents and works part-time at a movie theatre because he likes the free posters and candy he gets. Monica "dumps" him and he is never seen again.

Mr. Waltham 
Mr. Waltham (Paxton Whitehead): Rachel's boss at Bloomingdale's in season 4, who appears in "The One with Rachel's Crush" and "The One with Joey's Dirty Day" after Rachel is demoted to personal shopping after Joanna's death. He is Emily Waltham's uncle. Emily only meets and falls in love with Ross after Mr. Waltham asks Rachel to accompany Emily to the opera; Rachel blows Emily off to pursue Joshua, and convinces Ross to go with her instead.

Sarah, Duchess of York 
Sarah, Duchess of York (herself): Sarah makes a cameo appearance with Joey on his video camera, in "The One with Ross's Wedding".

Dr. Tim Burke 

Dr. Tim Burke (Michael Vartan): Richard Burke's son. Monica, who has an ice chip in her eye while she is taking out the turkey from the freezer, meets him. He is invited to share the Thanksgiving dinner in "The One With Chandler In A Box". Eventually, after they kiss, they both realize that dating each other is a mistake, as Monica compares Tim to his own father Richard, and they both get the ick.

Only in season 5

Danny 
Danny (né Daniel) (George Newbern): a man who has been on an around-the-world trip and returns in "The One with the Yeti". Rachel and Monica encounter the bearded man in the basement of their building and think he is a Yeti. Rachel is attracted to him but plays hard-to-get by pretending not to be interested in a housewarming party he is throwing. They eventually get together, but Rachel dumps him when she discovers he has a "special bond" with his sister.

Katie 
Katie (Soleil Moon Frye): The titular girl in "The One with the Girl Who Hits Joey", she is extremely energetic and throws play-punches to emphasize her point that are much harder than she realizes. A seemingly nice person nonetheless, whenever she playfully punches Joey on the arm she accidentally hurts him, but is oblivious to this. When Joey actually tells her, she thinks he is merely making good-natured fun of her small size. Joey eventually decides he wants to break up with her, but worries about how hard she will hit him if she is actually upset, Rachel gives him a way out when she kicks Katie's ankle in retaliation for one of Katie's punches, and when Joey refuses to stick up for Katie, she breaks up with him and leaves. She is never seen again afterwards.

Dr. Donald Ledbetter 
Dr. Donald Ledbetter (Michael Ensign): Ross's boss at the museum. After he eats Ross's leftover Thanksgiving turkey sandwich in "The One with Ross's Sandwich", Ross angrily shouts at him, and he puts Ross on sabbatical. He reappears in the tag scene of "The One Where Everybody Finds Out".

Gary 
Gary (Michael Rapaport): a cop who accidentally leaves his badge in Central Perk. Phoebe finds it and starts impersonating a police officer. He tracks her down and, not wanting the fact that he left his badge behind in a coffee shop to get out, decides not to arrest Phoebe and, feeling attracted to her, asks her out to dinner, and they start dating. He takes Ross, Joey and Chandler on a ride-along while at the same time being irritated by their quirks, and asks Phoebe to move in with him. She leaves him after he shoots a bird on his windowsill just because it was irritating him by chirping too loudly. He is never seen again after that.

Frank Buffay Sr. 
Frank Buffay Sr. (Bob Balaban): Phoebe, Ursula, and Frank Jr.'s father. He shows up at Phoebe's adoptive grandmother's funeral looking for his late wife, Lily. His defense for abandoning Phoebe and Ursula is that "I was a lousy father", and he shares a "lullaby" he used to try to sing to them, which has a striking resemblance to Phoebe's "Smelly Cat".

Only in season 6

Janine LaCroix 
Janine LaCroix (Elle Macpherson): Joey's female roommate after Chandler moves in with Monica. Joey places an ad for a new roommate in "The One Where Phoebe Runs"; attractive Australian dancer Janine applies and Joey immediately gives her the room without knowing anything else about her. She adds a feminine touch to the apartment by hanging pictures of babies, flowers, and babies dressed as flowers, which unnerves Joey—who senses that he's "becoming a woman". They get together during the recording of Dick Clark's New Year's Rockin' Eve, but break up after she reveals she does not like Monica and Chandler. She moves out soon after and is never seen again in the series.

The Judge 
The Judge (Conchata Ferrell) presides over the attempt of Ross and Rachel—who got married in Las Vegas while drunk—to get an annulment; she informs them that they have to get a divorce instead.

Jill Green 
Jill Green (Reese Witherspoon): one of Rachel's two sisters, who arrives at Monica and Chandler's in "The One with Rachel's Sister", thinking Rachel still lives there. Their father has cut off Jill's supply of money and sent her to stay with Rachel, "the only daughter he's ever been proud of". She is vain, ditzy, materialistic and spoiled, a lot like her other sister Amy, but is a lot kinder towards Rachel and her friends. Rachel tries to train Jill in the ways of the world but, Jill just buys herself expensive things. She dates Ross to spite Rachel and is occasionally bewildered by quirks from both of them but leaves in the subsequent episode after Ross rejects her and she destroys his slide projector in her rage. Jill is mentioned in season 10 when Amy gleefully reveals she has gotten fat, having gained fifteen pounds (a reference to Witherspoon's pregnancy).

Elizabeth Stevens 
Elizabeth Stevens (Alexandra Holden): one of Ross's students, whom he starts dating in "The One Where Ross Dates a Student", mistakenly believing it is not against university rules. In "The One with Joey's Fridge", Elizabeth heads to the beach with several guys for spring break;—jealous and worried, Ross follows her down there, appearing dancing with her on MTV. He breaks up with her in "The One with the Proposal, Part 1" when it becomes clear to him that she is too young for a serious relationship with him. Elizabeth then angrily throws a water ballon from her apartment hitting Ross square in the head, drenching him. She is never seen again in the series after that.

Paul Stevens 
Paul Stevens (Bruce Willis), Elizabeth's father, who takes an instant dislike to Ross; he threatens to have Ross fired from the university unless he ends his relationship with Elizabeth. After Rachel joins the three of them for dinner, Paul and Rachel start dating. The two couples end up at Paul's country cabin in "The One Where Paul's the Man", unbeknownst to each other. Ross hears Paul psyching himself up in the mirror and singing "Love Machine", and uses this knowledge to blackmail Paul into not revealing his relationship with Elizabeth to the university. After Ross and Elizabeth break up, Rachel continues to date Paul, but feels that he is too closed-off and attempts to get him to open up emotionally; she regrets this when he does open up, breaking down in tears and talking about his past for hours, and she breaks up with him.

Bruce Willis donated his appearance fee to five charities after losing a bet with his The Whole Nine Yards co-star Matthew Perry. He won the Primetime Emmy Award for Outstanding Guest Actor in a Comedy Series for his role.

Only in season 7

Erin 
Joey has a one-night stand with Erin (Kristin Davis), but when he leaves the apartment and asks Rachel and Phoebe to get rid of her, they do not; Joey is forced to date her again and develops feelings for her, but then she decides to dump him, leaving it to Rachel and Phoebe to tell Joey.

Cecilia Monroe 

Cecilia Monroe (Susan Sarandon) is a soap opera diva who has played Jessica Lockhart on Days of Our Lives for years, famous for throwing drinks at people and slapping their faces. When her character is killed off, her brain is transferred to Joey's Dr. Drake Ramoray.

Cecilia sleeps with Joey and teaches him how to "play" her, but then takes a role in Mexico, ending their relationship and never appearing on the show again.

Cassie Geller 
Cassie Geller (Denise Richards): a cousin of Ross and Monica who comes to stay with Monica and Chandler. The engaged Chandler, her cousin Ross and the otherwise heterosexual Phoebe are all attracted to her. Initially, Chandler's constant staring requires her to stay at Ross's apartment instead. While watching a movie, Ross convinces himself that she "wants it" too, and makes a move. Cassie's negative reaction leaves him speechless for what seems to him like an eternity, and he then worsens the situation by saying, "I haven't had sex in a very long time." Consequently, Cassie stays with Phoebe, who thinks to herself that she should ask her out as Cassie is not her cousin.

Melissa Warburton 
Melissa Warburton (Winona Ryder): one of Rachel's sorority sisters in college. During their senior year, Melissa and Rachel went to the Sigma Chi luau wearing coconut bikinis—and, after drinking too much sangria, ended up making out. Melissa fell in love with Rachel and never forgot that night, but Rachel never saw it as anything more than a wild college experience. Rachel runs into Melissa in Central Perk and they go out to dinner. When Rachel confronts Melissa about the kiss, she pretends to have no memory of it ever happening because she does not think Rachel will return her love. At the end of dinner, Rachel kisses her again to prove to Phoebe that she can do something crazy. Melissa takes this to mean that Rachel loves her back. She says that "nobody can kiss that good and not mean it", but Rachel says that she is just a good kisser. Melissa is extremely embarrassed and tries to act as if she was kidding, saying, "I'm not in love with you. I don't hear coconuts banging together. I don't picture your face when I make love to my boyfriend..." Melissa leaves, but not before asking for another kiss goodbye, which she does not get. She is never seen again after that.

Richard Crosby 
Richard Crosby (Gary Oldman): a pedantic actor with whom Joey shares scenes in a wartime drama, also from "The One with Monica and Chandler's Wedding" (he appears in parts 1 and 2). He gets a bad first impression of Joey when the latter irritates him by congratulating him for winning an Oscar he actually had not won. Crosby insists that real actors spit when they enunciate, resulting in both actors spitting on each other during takes, and being given towels by the crew afterwards. Crosby later shows up drunk for work, arousing concern as to whether Joey will complete his scenes in time to attend the wedding. For his performance, Oldman received a nomination for the Primetime Emmy Award for Outstanding Guest Actor in a Comedy Series.

Only in season 8

Mona 
Mona (Bonnie Somerville), a co-worker at Monica's restaurant, first meets Ross in "The One After 'I Do'". They later get reacquainted in "The One with Rachel's Date" (airdate October 25, 2001; season 8, No. 5) and begin dating. Their relationship is troubled from the start due to Ross being the father of Rachel's baby; in "The One with the Stripper", Leonard Green calls her a "tramp" after Ross does not propose to Rachel, and Ross regularly forgets dates with her when Rachel has problems with the baby. They eventually break up in "The One with the Birthing Video" (airdate February 7, 2002; season 8, No. 15) after Rachel lets slip that she is moving in with Ross until the baby is born. In "The One with the Tea Leaves" (airdate March 7, 2002; season 8, No. 17), Ross sneaks into her apartment to recover his "faded salmon color" shirt, which he left there, but has to hide when she arrives home with a date and is discovered when she and her date start making out and he tries to slip out; while Mona is angry with Ross at first, she later visits to accept his apology and assumes that he still has feelings for her. She admits that she still has feelings for him as well but insists they have to move on. She asks Ross if she can keep the shirt to remember him, but Ross really only wanted his shirt back, and she leaves for good once he takes it back.

Dina Tribbiani 
Dina Tribbiani (Marla Sokoloff): Joey's youngest sister, who appeared in the episode "The One With Monica's Boots". She is considered the smartest and most well behaved of the Tribbiani children. She took the SATs and went to college for "both years", but still isn't terribly bright. At one point, she asks Rachel, "Do you ever worry that you'll be walking and your baby will just slip out?" When Dina discovered she was pregnant, she went to Rachel first because Rachel herself is unmarried and pregnant at the time and is asking her to help her tell Joey. Dina says that Joey is her favorite guy in the world and that she was more scared to tell him that she was pregnant than anyone else. She got pregnant by her boyfriend, Bobby Corso. Although not mentioned by name, the character of Dina Tribbiani also appeared in the episode "The One Where Chandler Can't Remember Which Sister".

Bobby 
Bobby (Marc Rose): Dina Tribbiani's boyfriend and her unborn child's father.

Dr. Long 
Dr. Long (Amanda Carlin): Rachel's obstetrician, who appears in five episodes of season 8. She delivers the baby in "The One Where Rachel Has a Baby" after Rachel's extremely long labor.

Eric 
Eric (Sean Penn): Ursula Buffay's boyfriend, whom she brings to Monica's Halloween party in "The One with the Halloween Party" (airdate November 1, 2001; season 8, No. 6). Phoebe is attracted to him but learns that Ursula has lied about herself in order to marry him, and so promptly warns him about Ursula's lies. He dumps her and in "The One with the Stain" and tries to get together with Phoebe, but cannot stand to look at her as she reminds him of her sister. Phoebe is able to convince him to see past that, and after she leaves for a massage client after their make-out session, she comes back only to find that Eric had sex with Ursula thinking she was Phoebe. They awkwardly decide that it is too weird to pursue things any further. Penn got the role after he made several visits to the Friends set with his children, who were fans of the show.

Will Colbert 
Will Colbert (Brad Pitt): formerly overweight high school friend of Monica and Ross with a grudge against Rachel. Monica invites him over for Thanksgiving dinner in "The One with the Rumor" (airdate November 22, 2001; season 8, No. 9). Will has lost 150 pounds and now looks great—which makes Phoebe flirt with him. Here they find out that Will hates Rachel due to all the bullying he had suffered at her hands in high school and had co-founded the "I Hate Rachel Green Club" with Ross and spread rumors about her being a hermaphrodite. He is last seen looking bemused but amused when Joey enters the room wearing Phoebe's maternity pants (under the deluded belief that he would need to change into a new pair of pants to achieve his goal of eating an entire turkey all by himself). Pitt was married to Jennifer Aniston in real life at the time, and his given name is in fact "William".

Jim Nelson 
Jim Nelson (James LeGros): a bully who asks Phoebe out on a date, then to amuse himself intimidates her with a number of creepy, vulgar comments, causing her to walk out on him. Appears in "The One With The Tea Leaves".

Parker 
Parker (Alec Baldwin): an extremely energetic and optimistic man Phoebe meets at the dry cleaner in "The One with the Tea Leaves". He next appears in "The One in Massapequa" (airdate March 28, 2002; season 8, No. 18), where he meets the other five friends and annoys them with his habit of making a big fuss over everything, even the most trivial things. At Jack and Judy Geller's anniversary party, he drives everyone crazy by getting excited by anything and everything he sees. Phoebe overhears her friends making fun of Parker and scolds them, but he soon begins to irritate her as well. At her apartment after the party, unable to listen to him anymore, Phoebe snaps and angrily tells him she wants him to be "much less happy"; he breaks up with her...only to return, excited, to compliment Phoebe on the argument they just had.

"Sick Bastard" and "Evil Bitch" 

"Sick Bastard" (Jimmy Palumbo) and "Evil Bitch" (Debi Mazar), the couple who are having a child and with whom Rachel, who is waiting to have her baby delivered, shares a semi-private room. The woman is apparently in pain and deeply frustrated about it, and the fact that her perverted husband keeps leering at Rachel earns him the brunt of her frustrations.

Only in season 9

Leonard Hayes 
Leonard Hayes (Jeff Goldblum), a director who thinks Joey does not act "urgent enough"; he gets a bad first impression of Joey when he mistakenly thinks the latter is making fun of him in their conversation shortly after they first meet, but quickly comes around when he realizes that Joey is actually complimenting him in his own way. When Joey does the audition while needing to urinate, Leonard is impressed by the newfound urgency in his performance, so the former drinks a lot of liquids in preparation for the second audition. All goes well in the aforementioned second audition—that is until Leonard, failing to realize that Joey needs to urinate, makes the mistake of telling him to "relax" causing him to wet his pants on the spot—to Leonard's chagrin.

Gavin Mitchell 
Gavin Mitchell (Dermot Mulroney), Rachel's temporary replacement at Polo Ralph Lauren. Zelner makes it known to Rachel that he likes Gavin, so Rachel ends her maternity leave early to compete with him in "The One Where Rachel Goes Back to Work" (airdate January 9, 2003; season 9, No. 11). Their working relationship has improved by "The One with Phoebe's Rats", and they kiss at her birthday party. In "The One Where Monica Sings" (airdate January 30, 2003; season 9, No. 13), Rachel tells Gavin that, although she likes him, a relationship would be difficult because of her history with Ross.

Steve 
Steve (Phill Lewis): Chandler's boss at his internship. Appears in "The One Where Rachel Goes Back to Work", "The One with the Mugging" and "The One with the Lottery", when he offers Chandler the job of junior copywriter.

Molly 
Molly (Melissa George): Emma's hot nanny, whom Ross gets to hire since Rachel does not see it in her. When Joey sees her, his lady killer instinct kicks in. Ross tries to make Joey stay away from her when he flirts with her, which makes Joey want her more. Ross wants Chandler to watch Joey and make sure he does not go after Molly. When Ross is lecturing Joey there is a knock on the door and it is Molly's girlfriend. They kiss, and Ross no longer has a problem—although Joey's even more turned on by her lesbian status. Molly makes one more cameo appearance, in "The One Where Monica Sings" (airdate January 30, 2003; season 9, No. 13).

Sandy 
Sandy (Freddie Prinze Jr.): Emma's first nanny. After unsuccessfully interviewing several female nannies, both Ross and Rachel are surprised to see that Sandy is male. During the interview he wins Rachel over and she hires him despite Ross not being keen. Sandy proves himself to be highly competent, advising Ross and Rachel that toy dinosaurs he found in the apartment were not age-appropriate for Emma (only for Ross to tell him that they were his [Ross'] toys, causing a bemused Sandy to reply "Also not age-appropriate") and even educating the idiotic Joey with his techniques; however, he is let go after Ross cannot get used to the idea of having a male nanny.

Zach 
Zach (John Stamos), a prospective sperm donor for Monica, who finds out that Chandler cannot get her pregnant.

Wendy 
Wendy (Selma Blair), a philandering co-worker of Chandler's in Tulsa, Oklahoma, who tries to seduce him when he's forced to spend Christmas there.

Only in season 10

Cameo appearances

 Jill Goodacre ("The One with the Blackout")
 Dick Clark ("The One with the Monkey")
 Jay Leno ("The One with Mrs. Bing")
 Jean-Claude Van Damme ("The One After the Superbowl: Part 2")
 Isabella Rossellini ("The One with Frank Jr.")
 Robin Williams and Billy Crystal ("The One with the Ultimate Fighting Champion")
 Charlton Heston ("The One with Joey's Dirty Day")
 Sarah Ferguson ("The One with Ross's Wedding: Part 1")
 Richard Branson ("The One with Ross's Wedding: Part 1")
 June Whitfield ("The One with Ross's Wedding: Part 2")
 Hugh Laurie ("The One with Ross's Wedding: Part 2")
 Gary Collins ("The One Where Phoebe Hates PBS")
 Ralph Lauren ("The One with Rachel's Inadvertent Kiss")
 McKenzie Westmore ("The One with Joey's Award")
 Trudie Styler ("The One with Monica's Boots")
 Matthew Ashford ("The One with the Soap Opera Party")
 Kyle Lowder ("The One with the Soap Opera Party")
 Farah Fath ("The One with the Soap Opera Party")
 Alexis Thorpe ("The One with the Soap Opera Party")
 Donny Osmond ("The One Where the Stripper Cries")
 Leslie Charleson ("The One Where the Stripper Cries")

References

Primary sources
 From Friends

 From elsewhere

Secondary sources

Bibliography
 
 The Original Friends Site

Friends and Joey characters
Lists of American sitcom television characters
Lists of romance television characters
Friends and Joey characters